

435001–435100 

|-bgcolor=#fefefe
| 435001 ||  || — || October 28, 2006 || Kitt Peak || Spacewatch || — || align=right data-sort-value="0.57" | 570 m || 
|-id=002 bgcolor=#fefefe
| 435002 ||  || — || September 27, 2006 || Mount Lemmon || Mount Lemmon Survey || NYS || align=right data-sort-value="0.53" | 530 m || 
|-id=003 bgcolor=#fefefe
| 435003 ||  || — || October 31, 2006 || Kitt Peak || Spacewatch || — || align=right data-sort-value="0.98" | 980 m || 
|-id=004 bgcolor=#fefefe
| 435004 ||  || — || October 16, 2006 || Kitt Peak || Spacewatch || — || align=right data-sort-value="0.62" | 620 m || 
|-id=005 bgcolor=#d6d6d6
| 435005 ||  || — || October 16, 2006 || Apache Point || A. C. Becker || EOS || align=right | 1.9 km || 
|-id=006 bgcolor=#d6d6d6
| 435006 ||  || — || October 11, 2006 || Apache Point || A. C. Becker || — || align=right | 2.6 km || 
|-id=007 bgcolor=#fefefe
| 435007 ||  || — || October 19, 2006 || Kitt Peak || Spacewatch || — || align=right data-sort-value="0.69" | 690 m || 
|-id=008 bgcolor=#d6d6d6
| 435008 ||  || — || November 9, 2006 || Kitt Peak || Spacewatch || HYG || align=right | 3.1 km || 
|-id=009 bgcolor=#d6d6d6
| 435009 ||  || — || October 21, 2006 || Kitt Peak || Spacewatch || — || align=right | 3.0 km || 
|-id=010 bgcolor=#d6d6d6
| 435010 ||  || — || October 21, 2006 || Kitt Peak || Spacewatch || — || align=right | 3.0 km || 
|-id=011 bgcolor=#d6d6d6
| 435011 ||  || — || October 20, 2006 || Mount Lemmon || Mount Lemmon Survey || EOS || align=right | 2.4 km || 
|-id=012 bgcolor=#fefefe
| 435012 ||  || — || September 26, 2006 || Mount Lemmon || Mount Lemmon Survey || — || align=right data-sort-value="0.67" | 670 m || 
|-id=013 bgcolor=#fefefe
| 435013 ||  || — || November 11, 2006 || Catalina || CSS || — || align=right | 1.2 km || 
|-id=014 bgcolor=#d6d6d6
| 435014 ||  || — || November 9, 2006 || Kitt Peak || Spacewatch || VER || align=right | 2.5 km || 
|-id=015 bgcolor=#d6d6d6
| 435015 ||  || — || November 11, 2006 || Kitt Peak || Spacewatch || — || align=right | 4.2 km || 
|-id=016 bgcolor=#fefefe
| 435016 ||  || — || November 11, 2006 || Kitt Peak || Spacewatch || — || align=right data-sort-value="0.62" | 620 m || 
|-id=017 bgcolor=#d6d6d6
| 435017 ||  || — || October 23, 2006 || Mount Lemmon || Mount Lemmon Survey || — || align=right | 3.1 km || 
|-id=018 bgcolor=#fefefe
| 435018 ||  || — || October 16, 2006 || Catalina || CSS || — || align=right data-sort-value="0.72" | 720 m || 
|-id=019 bgcolor=#d6d6d6
| 435019 ||  || — || November 11, 2006 || Kitt Peak || Spacewatch || — || align=right | 4.4 km || 
|-id=020 bgcolor=#d6d6d6
| 435020 ||  || — || November 11, 2006 || Kitt Peak || Spacewatch || — || align=right | 3.9 km || 
|-id=021 bgcolor=#fefefe
| 435021 ||  || — || November 11, 2006 || Mount Lemmon || Mount Lemmon Survey || — || align=right data-sort-value="0.74" | 740 m || 
|-id=022 bgcolor=#fefefe
| 435022 ||  || — || November 11, 2006 || Mount Lemmon || Mount Lemmon Survey || — || align=right data-sort-value="0.59" | 590 m || 
|-id=023 bgcolor=#d6d6d6
| 435023 ||  || — || November 11, 2006 || Mount Lemmon || Mount Lemmon Survey || — || align=right | 3.5 km || 
|-id=024 bgcolor=#d6d6d6
| 435024 ||  || — || September 28, 2006 || Mount Lemmon || Mount Lemmon Survey || — || align=right | 3.7 km || 
|-id=025 bgcolor=#fefefe
| 435025 ||  || — || October 19, 2006 || Kitt Peak || Spacewatch || — || align=right data-sort-value="0.77" | 770 m || 
|-id=026 bgcolor=#d6d6d6
| 435026 ||  || — || October 21, 2006 || Mount Lemmon || Mount Lemmon Survey || — || align=right | 3.1 km || 
|-id=027 bgcolor=#fefefe
| 435027 ||  || — || November 12, 2006 || Mount Lemmon || Mount Lemmon Survey || — || align=right data-sort-value="0.81" | 810 m || 
|-id=028 bgcolor=#fefefe
| 435028 ||  || — || September 30, 2006 || Mount Lemmon || Mount Lemmon Survey || — || align=right data-sort-value="0.78" | 780 m || 
|-id=029 bgcolor=#d6d6d6
| 435029 ||  || — || September 27, 2006 || Mount Lemmon || Mount Lemmon Survey || — || align=right | 3.0 km || 
|-id=030 bgcolor=#d6d6d6
| 435030 ||  || — || November 14, 2006 || Kitt Peak || Spacewatch || — || align=right | 3.5 km || 
|-id=031 bgcolor=#d6d6d6
| 435031 ||  || — || November 14, 2006 || Kitt Peak || Spacewatch || — || align=right | 2.6 km || 
|-id=032 bgcolor=#d6d6d6
| 435032 ||  || — || October 27, 2006 || Catalina || CSS || — || align=right | 3.8 km || 
|-id=033 bgcolor=#d6d6d6
| 435033 ||  || — || October 20, 2006 || Mount Lemmon || Mount Lemmon Survey || — || align=right | 3.4 km || 
|-id=034 bgcolor=#d6d6d6
| 435034 ||  || — || November 13, 2006 || Kitt Peak || Spacewatch || — || align=right | 4.2 km || 
|-id=035 bgcolor=#fefefe
| 435035 ||  || — || September 25, 2006 || Mount Lemmon || Mount Lemmon Survey || — || align=right data-sort-value="0.82" | 820 m || 
|-id=036 bgcolor=#d6d6d6
| 435036 ||  || — || November 2, 2006 || Mount Lemmon || Mount Lemmon Survey || — || align=right | 4.5 km || 
|-id=037 bgcolor=#d6d6d6
| 435037 ||  || — || November 16, 2006 || Kitt Peak || Spacewatch || — || align=right | 3.2 km || 
|-id=038 bgcolor=#d6d6d6
| 435038 ||  || — || October 23, 2006 || Mount Lemmon || Mount Lemmon Survey || — || align=right | 3.2 km || 
|-id=039 bgcolor=#fefefe
| 435039 ||  || — || November 15, 2006 || Catalina || CSS || — || align=right data-sort-value="0.80" | 800 m || 
|-id=040 bgcolor=#d6d6d6
| 435040 ||  || — || October 2, 2006 || Mount Lemmon || Mount Lemmon Survey || — || align=right | 2.5 km || 
|-id=041 bgcolor=#d6d6d6
| 435041 ||  || — || September 30, 2006 || Mount Lemmon || Mount Lemmon Survey || — || align=right | 2.7 km || 
|-id=042 bgcolor=#d6d6d6
| 435042 ||  || — || November 16, 2006 || Catalina || CSS || — || align=right | 4.5 km || 
|-id=043 bgcolor=#fefefe
| 435043 ||  || — || November 16, 2006 || Kitt Peak || Spacewatch || — || align=right data-sort-value="0.71" | 710 m || 
|-id=044 bgcolor=#d6d6d6
| 435044 ||  || — || November 10, 2006 || Kitt Peak || Spacewatch || — || align=right | 3.9 km || 
|-id=045 bgcolor=#fefefe
| 435045 ||  || — || October 21, 2006 || Kitt Peak || Spacewatch || — || align=right data-sort-value="0.87" | 870 m || 
|-id=046 bgcolor=#d6d6d6
| 435046 ||  || — || November 17, 2006 || Mount Lemmon || Mount Lemmon Survey || — || align=right | 4.5 km || 
|-id=047 bgcolor=#fefefe
| 435047 ||  || — || November 17, 2006 || Kitt Peak || Spacewatch || — || align=right data-sort-value="0.62" | 620 m || 
|-id=048 bgcolor=#fefefe
| 435048 ||  || — || September 27, 2006 || Mount Lemmon || Mount Lemmon Survey || — || align=right data-sort-value="0.82" | 820 m || 
|-id=049 bgcolor=#fefefe
| 435049 ||  || — || November 18, 2006 || Kitt Peak || Spacewatch || — || align=right data-sort-value="0.73" | 730 m || 
|-id=050 bgcolor=#fefefe
| 435050 ||  || — || November 18, 2006 || Kitt Peak || Spacewatch || — || align=right data-sort-value="0.73" | 730 m || 
|-id=051 bgcolor=#d6d6d6
| 435051 ||  || — || November 18, 2006 || Kitt Peak || Spacewatch || — || align=right | 2.9 km || 
|-id=052 bgcolor=#fefefe
| 435052 ||  || — || November 11, 2006 || Mount Lemmon || Mount Lemmon Survey || — || align=right data-sort-value="0.74" | 740 m || 
|-id=053 bgcolor=#d6d6d6
| 435053 ||  || — || September 27, 2006 || Mount Lemmon || Mount Lemmon Survey || — || align=right | 3.4 km || 
|-id=054 bgcolor=#d6d6d6
| 435054 ||  || — || November 19, 2006 || Kitt Peak || Spacewatch || — || align=right | 2.2 km || 
|-id=055 bgcolor=#d6d6d6
| 435055 ||  || — || November 11, 2006 || Kitt Peak || Spacewatch || — || align=right | 2.8 km || 
|-id=056 bgcolor=#fefefe
| 435056 ||  || — || November 20, 2006 || Kitt Peak || Spacewatch || — || align=right data-sort-value="0.79" | 790 m || 
|-id=057 bgcolor=#fefefe
| 435057 ||  || — || November 17, 2006 || Kitt Peak || Spacewatch || — || align=right data-sort-value="0.69" | 690 m || 
|-id=058 bgcolor=#FFC2E0
| 435058 ||  || — || December 12, 2006 || Kitt Peak || Spacewatch || AMO || align=right data-sort-value="0.32" | 320 m || 
|-id=059 bgcolor=#fefefe
| 435059 ||  || — || December 13, 2006 || Kitt Peak || Spacewatch || — || align=right data-sort-value="0.95" | 950 m || 
|-id=060 bgcolor=#fefefe
| 435060 ||  || — || November 16, 2006 || Kitt Peak || Spacewatch || — || align=right data-sort-value="0.91" | 910 m || 
|-id=061 bgcolor=#fefefe
| 435061 ||  || — || December 1, 2006 || Mount Lemmon || Mount Lemmon Survey || MAS || align=right data-sort-value="0.68" | 680 m || 
|-id=062 bgcolor=#fefefe
| 435062 ||  || — || December 14, 2006 || Kitt Peak || Spacewatch || — || align=right data-sort-value="0.89" | 890 m || 
|-id=063 bgcolor=#fefefe
| 435063 ||  || — || December 14, 2006 || Mount Lemmon || Mount Lemmon Survey || — || align=right data-sort-value="0.86" | 860 m || 
|-id=064 bgcolor=#fefefe
| 435064 ||  || — || December 17, 2006 || Mount Lemmon || Mount Lemmon Survey || H || align=right data-sort-value="0.70" | 700 m || 
|-id=065 bgcolor=#fefefe
| 435065 ||  || — || November 1, 2006 || Mount Lemmon || Mount Lemmon Survey || — || align=right data-sort-value="0.98" | 980 m || 
|-id=066 bgcolor=#fefefe
| 435066 ||  || — || December 16, 2006 || Kitt Peak || Spacewatch || — || align=right data-sort-value="0.69" | 690 m || 
|-id=067 bgcolor=#fefefe
| 435067 ||  || — || December 13, 2006 || Kitt Peak || Spacewatch || — || align=right data-sort-value="0.72" | 720 m || 
|-id=068 bgcolor=#fefefe
| 435068 ||  || — || December 24, 2006 || Kitt Peak || Spacewatch || V || align=right data-sort-value="0.63" | 630 m || 
|-id=069 bgcolor=#fefefe
| 435069 ||  || — || December 27, 2006 || Mount Lemmon || Mount Lemmon Survey || — || align=right data-sort-value="0.90" | 900 m || 
|-id=070 bgcolor=#fefefe
| 435070 ||  || — || December 27, 2006 || Kitt Peak || Spacewatch || — || align=right data-sort-value="0.72" | 720 m || 
|-id=071 bgcolor=#fefefe
| 435071 ||  || — || January 9, 2007 || Kitt Peak || Spacewatch || — || align=right data-sort-value="0.82" | 820 m || 
|-id=072 bgcolor=#fefefe
| 435072 ||  || — || January 9, 2007 || Kitt Peak || Spacewatch || — || align=right data-sort-value="0.87" | 870 m || 
|-id=073 bgcolor=#fefefe
| 435073 ||  || — || January 10, 2007 || Mount Lemmon || Mount Lemmon Survey || — || align=right data-sort-value="0.65" | 650 m || 
|-id=074 bgcolor=#fefefe
| 435074 ||  || — || November 18, 2006 || Mount Lemmon || Mount Lemmon Survey || — || align=right data-sort-value="0.78" | 780 m || 
|-id=075 bgcolor=#fefefe
| 435075 ||  || — || January 17, 2007 || Kitt Peak || Spacewatch || — || align=right | 1.0 km || 
|-id=076 bgcolor=#fefefe
| 435076 ||  || — || November 16, 2006 || Mount Lemmon || Mount Lemmon Survey || V || align=right data-sort-value="0.67" | 670 m || 
|-id=077 bgcolor=#fefefe
| 435077 ||  || — || November 3, 2005 || Kitt Peak || Spacewatch || NYS || align=right data-sort-value="0.69" | 690 m || 
|-id=078 bgcolor=#fefefe
| 435078 ||  || — || January 17, 2007 || Kitt Peak || Spacewatch || — || align=right | 2.4 km || 
|-id=079 bgcolor=#fefefe
| 435079 ||  || — || January 24, 2007 || Socorro || LINEAR || — || align=right | 1.0 km || 
|-id=080 bgcolor=#fefefe
| 435080 ||  || — || January 24, 2007 || Mount Lemmon || Mount Lemmon Survey || MAS || align=right data-sort-value="0.56" | 560 m || 
|-id=081 bgcolor=#fefefe
| 435081 ||  || — || January 26, 2007 || Kitt Peak || Spacewatch || NYS || align=right data-sort-value="0.53" | 530 m || 
|-id=082 bgcolor=#fefefe
| 435082 ||  || — || November 18, 2006 || Mount Lemmon || Mount Lemmon Survey || — || align=right data-sort-value="0.99" | 990 m || 
|-id=083 bgcolor=#fefefe
| 435083 ||  || — || January 24, 2007 || Catalina || CSS || V || align=right data-sort-value="0.69" | 690 m || 
|-id=084 bgcolor=#fefefe
| 435084 ||  || — || January 17, 2007 || Kitt Peak || Spacewatch || — || align=right data-sort-value="0.79" | 790 m || 
|-id=085 bgcolor=#fefefe
| 435085 ||  || — || January 27, 2007 || Mount Lemmon || Mount Lemmon Survey || V || align=right data-sort-value="0.62" | 620 m || 
|-id=086 bgcolor=#fefefe
| 435086 ||  || — || February 6, 2007 || Kitt Peak || Spacewatch || — || align=right data-sort-value="0.87" | 870 m || 
|-id=087 bgcolor=#fefefe
| 435087 ||  || — || January 27, 2007 || Mount Lemmon || Mount Lemmon Survey || — || align=right data-sort-value="0.79" | 790 m || 
|-id=088 bgcolor=#fefefe
| 435088 ||  || — || February 8, 2007 || Mount Lemmon || Mount Lemmon Survey || NYS || align=right data-sort-value="0.76" | 760 m || 
|-id=089 bgcolor=#fefefe
| 435089 ||  || — || January 27, 2007 || Kitt Peak || Spacewatch || — || align=right data-sort-value="0.64" | 640 m || 
|-id=090 bgcolor=#fefefe
| 435090 ||  || — || January 9, 2007 || Mount Lemmon || Mount Lemmon Survey || — || align=right data-sort-value="0.59" | 590 m || 
|-id=091 bgcolor=#fefefe
| 435091 ||  || — || January 27, 2007 || Kitt Peak || Spacewatch || — || align=right data-sort-value="0.73" | 730 m || 
|-id=092 bgcolor=#fefefe
| 435092 ||  || — || January 27, 2007 || Mount Lemmon || Mount Lemmon Survey || — || align=right data-sort-value="0.75" | 750 m || 
|-id=093 bgcolor=#fefefe
| 435093 ||  || — || February 7, 2007 || Mount Lemmon || Mount Lemmon Survey || — || align=right data-sort-value="0.99" | 990 m || 
|-id=094 bgcolor=#fefefe
| 435094 ||  || — || January 27, 2007 || Mount Lemmon || Mount Lemmon Survey || NYS || align=right data-sort-value="0.57" | 570 m || 
|-id=095 bgcolor=#fefefe
| 435095 ||  || — || January 10, 2007 || Mount Lemmon || Mount Lemmon Survey || V || align=right data-sort-value="0.72" | 720 m || 
|-id=096 bgcolor=#fefefe
| 435096 ||  || — || January 29, 2007 || Kitt Peak || Spacewatch || — || align=right data-sort-value="0.79" | 790 m || 
|-id=097 bgcolor=#fefefe
| 435097 ||  || — || January 17, 2007 || Catalina || CSS || — || align=right | 1.1 km || 
|-id=098 bgcolor=#fefefe
| 435098 ||  || — || February 10, 2007 || Catalina || CSS || — || align=right | 1.1 km || 
|-id=099 bgcolor=#fefefe
| 435099 ||  || — || February 8, 2007 || Mount Lemmon || Mount Lemmon Survey || — || align=right data-sort-value="0.83" | 830 m || 
|-id=100 bgcolor=#fefefe
| 435100 ||  || — || February 17, 2007 || Kitt Peak || Spacewatch || — || align=right data-sort-value="0.86" | 860 m || 
|}

435101–435200 

|-bgcolor=#fefefe
| 435101 ||  || — || January 28, 2007 || Mount Lemmon || Mount Lemmon Survey || — || align=right data-sort-value="0.91" | 910 m || 
|-id=102 bgcolor=#fefefe
| 435102 ||  || — || February 17, 2007 || Kitt Peak || Spacewatch || NYS || align=right data-sort-value="0.56" | 560 m || 
|-id=103 bgcolor=#fefefe
| 435103 ||  || — || January 28, 2007 || Mount Lemmon || Mount Lemmon Survey || NYS || align=right data-sort-value="0.65" | 650 m || 
|-id=104 bgcolor=#fefefe
| 435104 ||  || — || February 17, 2007 || Kitt Peak || Spacewatch || — || align=right data-sort-value="0.73" | 730 m || 
|-id=105 bgcolor=#fefefe
| 435105 ||  || — || February 17, 2007 || Kitt Peak || Spacewatch || — || align=right | 1.0 km || 
|-id=106 bgcolor=#fefefe
| 435106 ||  || — || January 15, 2007 || Mount Lemmon || Mount Lemmon Survey || — || align=right data-sort-value="0.72" | 720 m || 
|-id=107 bgcolor=#fefefe
| 435107 ||  || — || February 17, 2007 || Kitt Peak || Spacewatch || NYS || align=right data-sort-value="0.73" | 730 m || 
|-id=108 bgcolor=#fefefe
| 435108 ||  || — || February 18, 2007 || Calvin-Rehoboth || Calvin–Rehoboth Obs. || MAS || align=right data-sort-value="0.56" | 560 m || 
|-id=109 bgcolor=#fefefe
| 435109 ||  || — || February 21, 2007 || Mount Lemmon || Mount Lemmon Survey || MAS || align=right data-sort-value="0.70" | 700 m || 
|-id=110 bgcolor=#fefefe
| 435110 ||  || — || February 21, 2007 || Kitt Peak || Spacewatch || NYS || align=right data-sort-value="0.60" | 600 m || 
|-id=111 bgcolor=#E9E9E9
| 435111 ||  || — || February 21, 2007 || Kitt Peak || Spacewatch || critical || align=right | 1.0 km || 
|-id=112 bgcolor=#d6d6d6
| 435112 ||  || — || February 21, 2007 || Kitt Peak || Spacewatch || 3:2 || align=right | 3.1 km || 
|-id=113 bgcolor=#fefefe
| 435113 ||  || — || February 21, 2007 || Kitt Peak || Spacewatch || MAS || align=right data-sort-value="0.63" | 630 m || 
|-id=114 bgcolor=#fefefe
| 435114 ||  || — || February 13, 2007 || Mount Lemmon || Mount Lemmon Survey || MAS || align=right data-sort-value="0.72" | 720 m || 
|-id=115 bgcolor=#fefefe
| 435115 ||  || — || February 25, 2007 || Kitt Peak || Spacewatch || — || align=right data-sort-value="0.82" | 820 m || 
|-id=116 bgcolor=#fefefe
| 435116 ||  || — || January 17, 2007 || Kitt Peak || Spacewatch || MAS || align=right data-sort-value="0.75" | 750 m || 
|-id=117 bgcolor=#fefefe
| 435117 ||  || — || February 23, 2007 || Kitt Peak || Spacewatch || — || align=right data-sort-value="0.90" | 900 m || 
|-id=118 bgcolor=#fefefe
| 435118 ||  || — || December 20, 2006 || Mount Lemmon || Mount Lemmon Survey || — || align=right data-sort-value="0.72" | 720 m || 
|-id=119 bgcolor=#fefefe
| 435119 ||  || — || February 16, 2007 || Catalina || CSS || H || align=right data-sort-value="0.98" | 980 m || 
|-id=120 bgcolor=#fefefe
| 435120 ||  || — || February 23, 2007 || Mount Lemmon || Mount Lemmon Survey || — || align=right data-sort-value="0.67" | 670 m || 
|-id=121 bgcolor=#fefefe
| 435121 ||  || — || January 27, 2007 || Mount Lemmon || Mount Lemmon Survey || — || align=right | 1.2 km || 
|-id=122 bgcolor=#fefefe
| 435122 ||  || — || January 27, 2007 || Mount Lemmon || Mount Lemmon Survey || — || align=right data-sort-value="0.93" | 930 m || 
|-id=123 bgcolor=#fefefe
| 435123 ||  || — || March 9, 2007 || Mount Lemmon || Mount Lemmon Survey || NYS || align=right data-sort-value="0.71" | 710 m || 
|-id=124 bgcolor=#E9E9E9
| 435124 ||  || — || February 27, 2007 || Kitt Peak || Spacewatch || — || align=right data-sort-value="0.94" | 940 m || 
|-id=125 bgcolor=#fefefe
| 435125 ||  || — || February 25, 2007 || Mount Lemmon || Mount Lemmon Survey || — || align=right data-sort-value="0.64" | 640 m || 
|-id=126 bgcolor=#fefefe
| 435126 ||  || — || March 10, 2007 || Kitt Peak || Spacewatch || — || align=right data-sort-value="0.61" | 610 m || 
|-id=127 bgcolor=#fefefe
| 435127 Virtelpro ||  ||  || March 14, 2007 || Ceccano || G. Masi || H || align=right data-sort-value="0.65" | 650 m || 
|-id=128 bgcolor=#fefefe
| 435128 ||  || — || March 11, 2007 || Mount Lemmon || Mount Lemmon Survey || NYS || align=right data-sort-value="0.71" | 710 m || 
|-id=129 bgcolor=#E9E9E9
| 435129 ||  || — || April 7, 2003 || Kitt Peak || Spacewatch || — || align=right data-sort-value="0.85" | 850 m || 
|-id=130 bgcolor=#fefefe
| 435130 ||  || — || March 9, 2007 || Mount Lemmon || Mount Lemmon Survey || — || align=right | 1.0 km || 
|-id=131 bgcolor=#fefefe
| 435131 ||  || — || February 26, 2007 || Mount Lemmon || Mount Lemmon Survey || MAS || align=right data-sort-value="0.75" | 750 m || 
|-id=132 bgcolor=#fefefe
| 435132 ||  || — || March 12, 2007 || Mount Lemmon || Mount Lemmon Survey || — || align=right | 1.1 km || 
|-id=133 bgcolor=#fefefe
| 435133 ||  || — || February 26, 2007 || Mount Lemmon || Mount Lemmon Survey || — || align=right data-sort-value="0.71" | 710 m || 
|-id=134 bgcolor=#fefefe
| 435134 ||  || — || March 26, 2007 || Mount Lemmon || Mount Lemmon Survey || H || align=right data-sort-value="0.58" | 580 m || 
|-id=135 bgcolor=#E9E9E9
| 435135 ||  || — || April 11, 2007 || Kitt Peak || Spacewatch || — || align=right | 1.4 km || 
|-id=136 bgcolor=#fefefe
| 435136 ||  || — || April 11, 2007 || Kitt Peak || Spacewatch || NYS || align=right data-sort-value="0.72" | 720 m || 
|-id=137 bgcolor=#E9E9E9
| 435137 ||  || — || March 13, 2007 || Mount Lemmon || Mount Lemmon Survey || KON || align=right | 2.1 km || 
|-id=138 bgcolor=#FFC2E0
| 435138 ||  || — || April 14, 2007 || Kitt Peak || Spacewatch || AMO +1km || align=right | 1.5 km || 
|-id=139 bgcolor=#fefefe
| 435139 ||  || — || April 15, 2007 || Kitt Peak || Spacewatch || — || align=right data-sort-value="0.98" | 980 m || 
|-id=140 bgcolor=#d6d6d6
| 435140 ||  || — || April 15, 2007 || Kitt Peak || Spacewatch || 3:2 || align=right | 4.8 km || 
|-id=141 bgcolor=#E9E9E9
| 435141 ||  || — || April 14, 2007 || Kitt Peak || Spacewatch || — || align=right data-sort-value="0.77" | 770 m || 
|-id=142 bgcolor=#E9E9E9
| 435142 ||  || — || April 18, 2007 || Kitt Peak || Spacewatch || — || align=right data-sort-value="0.81" | 810 m || 
|-id=143 bgcolor=#E9E9E9
| 435143 ||  || — || April 20, 2007 || Kitt Peak || Spacewatch || — || align=right data-sort-value="0.90" | 900 m || 
|-id=144 bgcolor=#FA8072
| 435144 ||  || — || April 20, 2007 || Kitt Peak || Spacewatch || H || align=right data-sort-value="0.76" | 760 m || 
|-id=145 bgcolor=#E9E9E9
| 435145 ||  || — || April 20, 2007 || Kitt Peak || Spacewatch || — || align=right | 1.9 km || 
|-id=146 bgcolor=#fefefe
| 435146 ||  || — || April 22, 2007 || Kitt Peak || Spacewatch || H || align=right data-sort-value="0.80" | 800 m || 
|-id=147 bgcolor=#fefefe
| 435147 ||  || — || April 22, 2007 || Mount Lemmon || Mount Lemmon Survey || H || align=right data-sort-value="0.48" | 480 m || 
|-id=148 bgcolor=#fefefe
| 435148 ||  || — || April 22, 2007 || Kitt Peak || Spacewatch || — || align=right | 1.1 km || 
|-id=149 bgcolor=#E9E9E9
| 435149 ||  || — || April 22, 2007 || Kitt Peak || Spacewatch || — || align=right data-sort-value="0.98" | 980 m || 
|-id=150 bgcolor=#E9E9E9
| 435150 ||  || — || May 9, 2007 || Kitt Peak || Spacewatch || — || align=right data-sort-value="0.94" | 940 m || 
|-id=151 bgcolor=#E9E9E9
| 435151 ||  || — || April 22, 2007 || Mount Lemmon || Mount Lemmon Survey || — || align=right | 1.1 km || 
|-id=152 bgcolor=#E9E9E9
| 435152 ||  || — || March 25, 2007 || Mount Lemmon || Mount Lemmon Survey || — || align=right | 1.2 km || 
|-id=153 bgcolor=#E9E9E9
| 435153 ||  || — || April 19, 2007 || Mount Lemmon || Mount Lemmon Survey || — || align=right data-sort-value="0.99" | 990 m || 
|-id=154 bgcolor=#E9E9E9
| 435154 ||  || — || April 25, 2007 || Catalina || CSS || — || align=right | 2.9 km || 
|-id=155 bgcolor=#E9E9E9
| 435155 ||  || — || May 26, 2007 || Catalina || CSS || — || align=right | 1.6 km || 
|-id=156 bgcolor=#E9E9E9
| 435156 ||  || — || May 12, 2007 || Mount Lemmon || Mount Lemmon Survey || EUN || align=right | 1.4 km || 
|-id=157 bgcolor=#E9E9E9
| 435157 ||  || — || May 13, 2007 || Kitt Peak || Spacewatch || — || align=right | 1.0 km || 
|-id=158 bgcolor=#E9E9E9
| 435158 ||  || — || May 26, 2007 || Mount Lemmon || Mount Lemmon Survey || — || align=right | 1.6 km || 
|-id=159 bgcolor=#FFC2E0
| 435159 ||  || — || June 13, 2007 || Siding Spring || SSS || APO +1kmPHA || align=right | 1.4 km || 
|-id=160 bgcolor=#E9E9E9
| 435160 ||  || — || June 18, 2007 || Kitt Peak || Spacewatch || — || align=right | 1.3 km || 
|-id=161 bgcolor=#E9E9E9
| 435161 ||  || — || July 14, 2007 || Vallemare di Borbona || V. S. Casulli || — || align=right | 2.8 km || 
|-id=162 bgcolor=#E9E9E9
| 435162 ||  || — || June 21, 2007 || Mount Lemmon || Mount Lemmon Survey || EUN || align=right | 1.3 km || 
|-id=163 bgcolor=#E9E9E9
| 435163 || 2007 OJ || — || July 17, 2007 || La Sagra || OAM Obs. || — || align=right data-sort-value="0.90" | 900 m || 
|-id=164 bgcolor=#E9E9E9
| 435164 ||  || — || July 18, 2007 || Črni Vrh || Črni Vrh || — || align=right | 1.6 km || 
|-id=165 bgcolor=#E9E9E9
| 435165 ||  || — || August 11, 2007 || Socorro || LINEAR || — || align=right | 1.9 km || 
|-id=166 bgcolor=#E9E9E9
| 435166 ||  || — || August 8, 2007 || Socorro || LINEAR || JUN || align=right | 1.2 km || 
|-id=167 bgcolor=#E9E9E9
| 435167 ||  || — || August 9, 2007 || Socorro || LINEAR || — || align=right | 2.1 km || 
|-id=168 bgcolor=#E9E9E9
| 435168 ||  || — || August 11, 2007 || Socorro || LINEAR || — || align=right | 1.5 km || 
|-id=169 bgcolor=#E9E9E9
| 435169 ||  || — || August 9, 2007 || Socorro || LINEAR || — || align=right | 1.4 km || 
|-id=170 bgcolor=#E9E9E9
| 435170 ||  || — || August 12, 2007 || Socorro || LINEAR || — || align=right | 1.6 km || 
|-id=171 bgcolor=#E9E9E9
| 435171 ||  || — || August 13, 2007 || Socorro || LINEAR || — || align=right | 2.7 km || 
|-id=172 bgcolor=#E9E9E9
| 435172 ||  || — || August 10, 2007 || Kitt Peak || Spacewatch || — || align=right | 1.3 km || 
|-id=173 bgcolor=#E9E9E9
| 435173 ||  || — || August 16, 2007 || Socorro || LINEAR || — || align=right | 1.9 km || 
|-id=174 bgcolor=#E9E9E9
| 435174 ||  || — || August 21, 2007 || Anderson Mesa || LONEOS || — || align=right | 1.7 km || 
|-id=175 bgcolor=#d6d6d6
| 435175 ||  || — || January 18, 2004 || Kitt Peak || Spacewatch || — || align=right | 3.3 km || 
|-id=176 bgcolor=#E9E9E9
| 435176 ||  || — || August 9, 2007 || Socorro || LINEAR || — || align=right | 2.7 km || 
|-id=177 bgcolor=#E9E9E9
| 435177 ||  || — || September 5, 2007 || Majorca || OAM Obs. || — || align=right | 1.6 km || 
|-id=178 bgcolor=#E9E9E9
| 435178 ||  || — || September 8, 2007 || Eskridge || G. Hug || — || align=right | 1.6 km || 
|-id=179 bgcolor=#E9E9E9
| 435179 ||  || — || September 2, 2007 || Catalina || CSS || — || align=right | 1.7 km || 
|-id=180 bgcolor=#E9E9E9
| 435180 ||  || — || August 18, 2007 || XuYi || PMO NEO || — || align=right | 2.5 km || 
|-id=181 bgcolor=#E9E9E9
| 435181 ||  || — || September 10, 2007 || Dauban || Chante-Perdrix Obs. || MRX || align=right data-sort-value="0.99" | 990 m || 
|-id=182 bgcolor=#E9E9E9
| 435182 ||  || — || September 3, 2007 || Catalina || CSS || — || align=right | 2.6 km || 
|-id=183 bgcolor=#E9E9E9
| 435183 ||  || — || August 9, 2007 || Socorro || LINEAR || — || align=right | 1.6 km || 
|-id=184 bgcolor=#E9E9E9
| 435184 ||  || — || September 4, 2007 || Mount Lemmon || Mount Lemmon Survey || — || align=right | 1.6 km || 
|-id=185 bgcolor=#FA8072
| 435185 ||  || — || September 5, 2007 || Catalina || CSS || — || align=right | 1.4 km || 
|-id=186 bgcolor=#E9E9E9
| 435186 Jovellanos ||  ||  || September 7, 2007 || La Cañada || J. Lacruz || — || align=right | 1.5 km || 
|-id=187 bgcolor=#E9E9E9
| 435187 ||  || — || September 9, 2007 || Kitt Peak || Spacewatch || — || align=right | 2.2 km || 
|-id=188 bgcolor=#E9E9E9
| 435188 ||  || — || September 10, 2007 || Catalina || CSS || — || align=right | 1.6 km || 
|-id=189 bgcolor=#E9E9E9
| 435189 ||  || — || September 10, 2007 || Kitt Peak || Spacewatch || — || align=right | 2.0 km || 
|-id=190 bgcolor=#d6d6d6
| 435190 ||  || — || September 10, 2007 || Kitt Peak || Spacewatch || — || align=right | 3.0 km || 
|-id=191 bgcolor=#E9E9E9
| 435191 ||  || — || September 10, 2007 || Mount Lemmon || Mount Lemmon Survey || EUN || align=right | 1.3 km || 
|-id=192 bgcolor=#E9E9E9
| 435192 ||  || — || September 10, 2007 || Mount Lemmon || Mount Lemmon Survey || — || align=right | 1.1 km || 
|-id=193 bgcolor=#E9E9E9
| 435193 ||  || — || September 10, 2007 || Kitt Peak || Spacewatch || DOR || align=right | 2.4 km || 
|-id=194 bgcolor=#E9E9E9
| 435194 ||  || — || September 8, 2007 || Anderson Mesa || LONEOS || GEF || align=right | 1.4 km || 
|-id=195 bgcolor=#E9E9E9
| 435195 ||  || — || September 11, 2007 || Mount Lemmon || Mount Lemmon Survey || — || align=right | 1.8 km || 
|-id=196 bgcolor=#d6d6d6
| 435196 ||  || — || September 11, 2007 || Kitt Peak || Spacewatch || — || align=right | 2.3 km || 
|-id=197 bgcolor=#d6d6d6
| 435197 ||  || — || September 11, 2007 || Mount Lemmon || Mount Lemmon Survey || — || align=right | 2.6 km || 
|-id=198 bgcolor=#E9E9E9
| 435198 ||  || — || September 12, 2007 || Catalina || CSS || EUN || align=right | 1.1 km || 
|-id=199 bgcolor=#d6d6d6
| 435199 ||  || — || September 11, 2007 || Marly || P. Kocher || BRA || align=right | 1.8 km || 
|-id=200 bgcolor=#E9E9E9
| 435200 ||  || — || September 12, 2007 || Anderson Mesa || LONEOS || EUN || align=right | 1.7 km || 
|}

435201–435300 

|-bgcolor=#E9E9E9
| 435201 ||  || — || September 10, 2007 || Kitt Peak || Spacewatch || — || align=right | 1.9 km || 
|-id=202 bgcolor=#d6d6d6
| 435202 ||  || — || September 10, 2007 || Kitt Peak || Spacewatch || KOR || align=right | 1.1 km || 
|-id=203 bgcolor=#E9E9E9
| 435203 ||  || — || September 10, 2007 || Kitt Peak || Spacewatch || — || align=right | 2.1 km || 
|-id=204 bgcolor=#E9E9E9
| 435204 ||  || — || September 11, 2007 || Mount Lemmon || Mount Lemmon Survey || AGN || align=right | 1.2 km || 
|-id=205 bgcolor=#E9E9E9
| 435205 ||  || — || September 9, 2007 || Kitt Peak || Spacewatch || — || align=right | 1.9 km || 
|-id=206 bgcolor=#E9E9E9
| 435206 ||  || — || September 8, 2007 || Anderson Mesa || LONEOS || ADE || align=right | 2.0 km || 
|-id=207 bgcolor=#E9E9E9
| 435207 ||  || — || September 9, 2007 || Kitt Peak || Spacewatch || — || align=right | 2.4 km || 
|-id=208 bgcolor=#d6d6d6
| 435208 ||  || — || September 12, 2007 || Anderson Mesa || LONEOS || — || align=right | 3.2 km || 
|-id=209 bgcolor=#d6d6d6
| 435209 ||  || — || September 14, 2007 || Mount Lemmon || Mount Lemmon Survey || — || align=right | 2.3 km || 
|-id=210 bgcolor=#E9E9E9
| 435210 ||  || — || September 11, 2007 || Mount Lemmon || Mount Lemmon Survey || — || align=right | 2.5 km || 
|-id=211 bgcolor=#E9E9E9
| 435211 ||  || — || September 10, 2007 || Kitt Peak || Spacewatch || AEO || align=right | 1.6 km || 
|-id=212 bgcolor=#E9E9E9
| 435212 ||  || — || September 10, 2007 || Kitt Peak || Spacewatch || — || align=right | 1.6 km || 
|-id=213 bgcolor=#E9E9E9
| 435213 ||  || — || September 14, 2007 || Catalina || CSS || — || align=right | 2.3 km || 
|-id=214 bgcolor=#E9E9E9
| 435214 ||  || — || September 14, 2007 || Catalina || CSS || — || align=right | 2.0 km || 
|-id=215 bgcolor=#E9E9E9
| 435215 ||  || — || September 15, 2007 || Socorro || LINEAR || — || align=right | 2.2 km || 
|-id=216 bgcolor=#E9E9E9
| 435216 ||  || — || September 11, 2007 || Kitt Peak || Spacewatch || — || align=right | 1.7 km || 
|-id=217 bgcolor=#d6d6d6
| 435217 ||  || — || September 13, 2007 || Mount Lemmon || Mount Lemmon Survey || KOR || align=right | 1.0 km || 
|-id=218 bgcolor=#E9E9E9
| 435218 ||  || — || September 13, 2007 || Mount Lemmon || Mount Lemmon Survey || AGN || align=right | 1.0 km || 
|-id=219 bgcolor=#E9E9E9
| 435219 ||  || — || September 14, 2007 || Catalina || CSS || — || align=right | 1.8 km || 
|-id=220 bgcolor=#E9E9E9
| 435220 ||  || — || September 15, 2007 || Kitt Peak || Spacewatch || ADE || align=right | 2.2 km || 
|-id=221 bgcolor=#E9E9E9
| 435221 ||  || — || September 5, 2007 || Siding Spring || SSS || — || align=right | 2.0 km || 
|-id=222 bgcolor=#E9E9E9
| 435222 ||  || — || September 12, 2007 || Mount Lemmon || Mount Lemmon Survey || (1547) || align=right | 1.6 km || 
|-id=223 bgcolor=#d6d6d6
| 435223 ||  || — || September 10, 2007 || Mount Lemmon || Mount Lemmon Survey || EOS || align=right | 1.7 km || 
|-id=224 bgcolor=#d6d6d6
| 435224 ||  || — || September 12, 2007 || Mount Lemmon || Mount Lemmon Survey || THM || align=right | 1.9 km || 
|-id=225 bgcolor=#E9E9E9
| 435225 ||  || — || September 9, 2007 || Kitt Peak || Spacewatch || — || align=right | 2.0 km || 
|-id=226 bgcolor=#d6d6d6
| 435226 ||  || — || September 14, 2007 || Kitt Peak || Spacewatch || KOR || align=right | 1.4 km || 
|-id=227 bgcolor=#d6d6d6
| 435227 ||  || — || September 5, 2007 || Catalina || CSS || — || align=right | 4.1 km || 
|-id=228 bgcolor=#E9E9E9
| 435228 ||  || — || September 12, 2007 || Mount Lemmon || Mount Lemmon Survey || — || align=right | 2.6 km || 
|-id=229 bgcolor=#C2FFFF
| 435229 ||  || — || September 10, 2007 || Mount Lemmon || Mount Lemmon Survey || L4 || align=right | 7.8 km || 
|-id=230 bgcolor=#E9E9E9
| 435230 ||  || — || September 15, 2007 || Socorro || LINEAR || MIS || align=right | 2.9 km || 
|-id=231 bgcolor=#d6d6d6
| 435231 ||  || — || September 13, 2007 || Mount Lemmon || Mount Lemmon Survey || — || align=right | 3.2 km || 
|-id=232 bgcolor=#E9E9E9
| 435232 ||  || — || September 3, 2007 || Catalina || CSS || — || align=right | 1.3 km || 
|-id=233 bgcolor=#E9E9E9
| 435233 ||  || — || September 10, 2007 || Kitt Peak || Spacewatch || — || align=right | 2.3 km || 
|-id=234 bgcolor=#d6d6d6
| 435234 ||  || — || September 10, 2007 || Mount Lemmon || Mount Lemmon Survey || — || align=right | 2.8 km || 
|-id=235 bgcolor=#d6d6d6
| 435235 ||  || — || September 12, 2007 || Mount Lemmon || Mount Lemmon Survey || — || align=right | 2.0 km || 
|-id=236 bgcolor=#d6d6d6
| 435236 ||  || — || September 14, 2007 || Mount Lemmon || Mount Lemmon Survey || EOS || align=right | 1.5 km || 
|-id=237 bgcolor=#d6d6d6
| 435237 ||  || — || September 14, 2007 || Mount Lemmon || Mount Lemmon Survey || EOS || align=right | 1.8 km || 
|-id=238 bgcolor=#E9E9E9
| 435238 ||  || — || September 15, 2007 || Socorro || LINEAR || — || align=right | 2.7 km || 
|-id=239 bgcolor=#E9E9E9
| 435239 ||  || — || September 14, 2007 || Mount Lemmon || Mount Lemmon Survey || — || align=right | 2.1 km || 
|-id=240 bgcolor=#E9E9E9
| 435240 ||  || — || August 27, 1998 || Kitt Peak || Spacewatch || — || align=right | 2.1 km || 
|-id=241 bgcolor=#d6d6d6
| 435241 ||  || — || September 19, 2007 || Kitt Peak || Spacewatch || — || align=right | 2.3 km || 
|-id=242 bgcolor=#d6d6d6
| 435242 ||  || — || September 21, 2007 || Kitt Peak || Spacewatch || — || align=right | 3.3 km || 
|-id=243 bgcolor=#E9E9E9
| 435243 ||  || — || October 6, 2007 || Socorro || LINEAR || — || align=right | 2.2 km || 
|-id=244 bgcolor=#E9E9E9
| 435244 ||  || — || October 6, 2007 || Socorro || LINEAR || — || align=right | 2.9 km || 
|-id=245 bgcolor=#E9E9E9
| 435245 ||  || — || October 9, 2007 || Eskridge || G. Hug || — || align=right | 2.2 km || 
|-id=246 bgcolor=#FA8072
| 435246 ||  || — || October 11, 2007 || Socorro || LINEAR || — || align=right data-sort-value="0.75" | 750 m || 
|-id=247 bgcolor=#d6d6d6
| 435247 ||  || — || October 6, 2007 || Kitt Peak || Spacewatch || — || align=right | 2.5 km || 
|-id=248 bgcolor=#E9E9E9
| 435248 ||  || — || September 5, 2007 || Catalina || CSS || — || align=right | 3.2 km || 
|-id=249 bgcolor=#d6d6d6
| 435249 ||  || — || September 9, 2007 || Mount Lemmon || Mount Lemmon Survey || — || align=right | 3.0 km || 
|-id=250 bgcolor=#d6d6d6
| 435250 ||  || — || October 4, 2007 || Kitt Peak || Spacewatch || EOS || align=right | 1.8 km || 
|-id=251 bgcolor=#d6d6d6
| 435251 ||  || — || October 4, 2007 || Kitt Peak || Spacewatch || — || align=right | 2.6 km || 
|-id=252 bgcolor=#E9E9E9
| 435252 ||  || — || October 10, 2007 || Mount Lemmon || Mount Lemmon Survey || — || align=right | 2.0 km || 
|-id=253 bgcolor=#E9E9E9
| 435253 ||  || — || October 7, 2007 || Catalina || CSS || — || align=right | 1.1 km || 
|-id=254 bgcolor=#d6d6d6
| 435254 ||  || — || October 8, 2007 || Mount Lemmon || Mount Lemmon Survey || — || align=right | 2.7 km || 
|-id=255 bgcolor=#d6d6d6
| 435255 ||  || — || October 8, 2007 || Mount Lemmon || Mount Lemmon Survey || — || align=right | 2.3 km || 
|-id=256 bgcolor=#d6d6d6
| 435256 ||  || — || October 7, 2007 || Mount Lemmon || Mount Lemmon Survey || EOS || align=right | 2.2 km || 
|-id=257 bgcolor=#d6d6d6
| 435257 ||  || — || October 9, 2007 || Mount Lemmon || Mount Lemmon Survey || — || align=right | 3.2 km || 
|-id=258 bgcolor=#d6d6d6
| 435258 ||  || — || September 5, 2007 || Mount Lemmon || Mount Lemmon Survey || — || align=right | 2.8 km || 
|-id=259 bgcolor=#d6d6d6
| 435259 ||  || — || September 12, 2007 || Mount Lemmon || Mount Lemmon Survey || — || align=right | 3.2 km || 
|-id=260 bgcolor=#E9E9E9
| 435260 ||  || — || October 11, 2007 || Socorro || LINEAR || — || align=right | 2.4 km || 
|-id=261 bgcolor=#E9E9E9
| 435261 ||  || — || October 8, 2007 || Kitt Peak || Spacewatch || AEO || align=right | 1.3 km || 
|-id=262 bgcolor=#E9E9E9
| 435262 ||  || — || May 25, 2006 || Mount Lemmon || Mount Lemmon Survey || — || align=right | 2.0 km || 
|-id=263 bgcolor=#d6d6d6
| 435263 ||  || — || October 8, 2007 || Kitt Peak || Spacewatch || KOR || align=right | 1.2 km || 
|-id=264 bgcolor=#d6d6d6
| 435264 ||  || — || October 7, 2007 || Kitt Peak || Spacewatch || — || align=right | 2.4 km || 
|-id=265 bgcolor=#d6d6d6
| 435265 ||  || — || October 7, 2007 || Kitt Peak || Spacewatch || EOS || align=right | 1.6 km || 
|-id=266 bgcolor=#d6d6d6
| 435266 ||  || — || October 8, 2007 || Kitt Peak || Spacewatch || — || align=right | 1.9 km || 
|-id=267 bgcolor=#d6d6d6
| 435267 ||  || — || October 8, 2007 || Kitt Peak || Spacewatch || — || align=right | 2.6 km || 
|-id=268 bgcolor=#d6d6d6
| 435268 ||  || — || October 8, 2007 || Kitt Peak || Spacewatch || EOS || align=right | 1.6 km || 
|-id=269 bgcolor=#E9E9E9
| 435269 ||  || — || October 8, 2007 || Mount Lemmon || Mount Lemmon Survey || AST || align=right | 1.7 km || 
|-id=270 bgcolor=#d6d6d6
| 435270 ||  || — || October 9, 2007 || Kitt Peak || Spacewatch || — || align=right | 3.6 km || 
|-id=271 bgcolor=#d6d6d6
| 435271 ||  || — || October 7, 2007 || Mount Lemmon || Mount Lemmon Survey || KOR || align=right | 1.2 km || 
|-id=272 bgcolor=#d6d6d6
| 435272 ||  || — || September 15, 2007 || Mount Lemmon || Mount Lemmon Survey || — || align=right | 2.1 km || 
|-id=273 bgcolor=#d6d6d6
| 435273 ||  || — || October 9, 2007 || Kitt Peak || Spacewatch || — || align=right | 3.2 km || 
|-id=274 bgcolor=#E9E9E9
| 435274 ||  || — || October 7, 2007 || Catalina || CSS || — || align=right | 3.2 km || 
|-id=275 bgcolor=#d6d6d6
| 435275 ||  || — || October 11, 2007 || Catalina || CSS || — || align=right | 2.5 km || 
|-id=276 bgcolor=#E9E9E9
| 435276 ||  || — || October 8, 2007 || Kitt Peak || Spacewatch ||  || align=right | 2.1 km || 
|-id=277 bgcolor=#E9E9E9
| 435277 ||  || — || September 13, 2007 || Kitt Peak || Spacewatch || — || align=right | 2.2 km || 
|-id=278 bgcolor=#d6d6d6
| 435278 ||  || — || October 12, 2007 || Kitt Peak || Spacewatch || — || align=right | 2.4 km || 
|-id=279 bgcolor=#d6d6d6
| 435279 ||  || — || October 12, 2007 || Kitt Peak || Spacewatch || TRE || align=right | 2.0 km || 
|-id=280 bgcolor=#E9E9E9
| 435280 ||  || — || October 12, 2007 || Kitt Peak || Spacewatch || — || align=right | 1.6 km || 
|-id=281 bgcolor=#d6d6d6
| 435281 ||  || — || October 7, 2007 || Kitt Peak || Spacewatch || — || align=right | 2.6 km || 
|-id=282 bgcolor=#E9E9E9
| 435282 ||  || — || September 14, 2007 || Mount Lemmon || Mount Lemmon Survey || — || align=right | 1.3 km || 
|-id=283 bgcolor=#d6d6d6
| 435283 ||  || — || October 13, 2007 || Mount Lemmon || Mount Lemmon Survey || — || align=right | 3.4 km || 
|-id=284 bgcolor=#d6d6d6
| 435284 ||  || — || October 14, 2007 || Mount Lemmon || Mount Lemmon Survey || — || align=right | 2.4 km || 
|-id=285 bgcolor=#E9E9E9
| 435285 ||  || — || October 14, 2007 || Mount Lemmon || Mount Lemmon Survey || — || align=right | 1.4 km || 
|-id=286 bgcolor=#E9E9E9
| 435286 ||  || — || October 11, 2007 || Catalina || CSS || — || align=right | 3.0 km || 
|-id=287 bgcolor=#d6d6d6
| 435287 ||  || — || October 14, 2007 || Kitt Peak || Spacewatch || — || align=right | 3.5 km || 
|-id=288 bgcolor=#d6d6d6
| 435288 ||  || — || October 14, 2007 || Mount Lemmon || Mount Lemmon Survey || EOS || align=right | 1.8 km || 
|-id=289 bgcolor=#d6d6d6
| 435289 ||  || — || October 13, 2007 || Mount Lemmon || Mount Lemmon Survey || — || align=right | 2.0 km || 
|-id=290 bgcolor=#E9E9E9
| 435290 ||  || — || October 10, 2007 || Catalina || CSS || JUN || align=right | 1.2 km || 
|-id=291 bgcolor=#E9E9E9
| 435291 ||  || — || October 15, 2007 || Anderson Mesa || LONEOS || — || align=right | 2.3 km || 
|-id=292 bgcolor=#E9E9E9
| 435292 ||  || — || October 15, 2007 || Anderson Mesa || LONEOS || — || align=right | 1.8 km || 
|-id=293 bgcolor=#E9E9E9
| 435293 ||  || — || October 15, 2007 || Catalina || CSS || DOR || align=right | 2.7 km || 
|-id=294 bgcolor=#E9E9E9
| 435294 ||  || — || October 4, 2007 || Kitt Peak || Spacewatch || — || align=right | 2.2 km || 
|-id=295 bgcolor=#d6d6d6
| 435295 ||  || — || October 9, 2007 || Kitt Peak || Spacewatch || EOS || align=right | 1.8 km || 
|-id=296 bgcolor=#d6d6d6
| 435296 ||  || — || September 10, 2007 || Mount Lemmon || Mount Lemmon Survey || — || align=right | 2.9 km || 
|-id=297 bgcolor=#d6d6d6
| 435297 ||  || — || October 7, 2007 || Mount Lemmon || Mount Lemmon Survey || — || align=right | 2.2 km || 
|-id=298 bgcolor=#d6d6d6
| 435298 ||  || — || October 12, 2007 || Catalina || CSS || — || align=right | 2.7 km || 
|-id=299 bgcolor=#d6d6d6
| 435299 ||  || — || October 10, 2007 || Catalina || CSS || — || align=right | 3.0 km || 
|-id=300 bgcolor=#d6d6d6
| 435300 ||  || — || October 10, 2007 || Mount Lemmon || Mount Lemmon Survey || — || align=right | 2.2 km || 
|}

435301–435400 

|-bgcolor=#d6d6d6
| 435301 ||  || — || October 14, 2007 || Mount Lemmon || Mount Lemmon Survey || — || align=right | 3.0 km || 
|-id=302 bgcolor=#FFC2E0
| 435302 ||  || — || October 21, 2007 || Socorro || LINEAR || AMO +1km || align=right data-sort-value="0.80" | 800 m || 
|-id=303 bgcolor=#E9E9E9
| 435303 ||  || — || October 17, 2007 || Catalina || CSS || — || align=right | 2.4 km || 
|-id=304 bgcolor=#d6d6d6
| 435304 ||  || — || October 16, 2007 || Mount Lemmon || Mount Lemmon Survey || EOS || align=right | 1.5 km || 
|-id=305 bgcolor=#E9E9E9
| 435305 ||  || — || October 18, 2007 || Mount Lemmon || Mount Lemmon Survey || — || align=right | 2.9 km || 
|-id=306 bgcolor=#d6d6d6
| 435306 ||  || — || October 24, 2007 || Mount Lemmon || Mount Lemmon Survey || — || align=right | 3.3 km || 
|-id=307 bgcolor=#d6d6d6
| 435307 ||  || — || October 30, 2007 || Kitt Peak || Spacewatch || — || align=right | 2.9 km || 
|-id=308 bgcolor=#E9E9E9
| 435308 ||  || — || October 30, 2007 || Kitt Peak || Spacewatch || — || align=right | 2.2 km || 
|-id=309 bgcolor=#d6d6d6
| 435309 ||  || — || October 10, 2007 || Kitt Peak || Spacewatch || — || align=right | 2.5 km || 
|-id=310 bgcolor=#E9E9E9
| 435310 ||  || — || October 30, 2007 || Mount Lemmon || Mount Lemmon Survey || — || align=right | 2.4 km || 
|-id=311 bgcolor=#d6d6d6
| 435311 ||  || — || October 7, 2007 || Mount Lemmon || Mount Lemmon Survey || — || align=right | 1.9 km || 
|-id=312 bgcolor=#d6d6d6
| 435312 ||  || — || October 8, 2007 || Kitt Peak || Spacewatch || — || align=right | 2.3 km || 
|-id=313 bgcolor=#d6d6d6
| 435313 ||  || — || October 30, 2007 || Kitt Peak || Spacewatch || EOS || align=right | 1.9 km || 
|-id=314 bgcolor=#d6d6d6
| 435314 ||  || — || October 16, 2007 || Mount Lemmon || Mount Lemmon Survey || — || align=right | 3.7 km || 
|-id=315 bgcolor=#d6d6d6
| 435315 ||  || — || August 24, 2007 || Kitt Peak || Spacewatch || — || align=right | 3.2 km || 
|-id=316 bgcolor=#d6d6d6
| 435316 ||  || — || October 4, 2007 || Kitt Peak || Spacewatch || — || align=right | 2.1 km || 
|-id=317 bgcolor=#d6d6d6
| 435317 ||  || — || October 20, 2007 || Kitt Peak || Spacewatch || — || align=right | 2.2 km || 
|-id=318 bgcolor=#d6d6d6
| 435318 ||  || — || October 8, 2007 || Mount Lemmon || Mount Lemmon Survey || — || align=right | 2.0 km || 
|-id=319 bgcolor=#d6d6d6
| 435319 ||  || — || October 16, 2007 || Mount Lemmon || Mount Lemmon Survey || EOS || align=right | 1.8 km || 
|-id=320 bgcolor=#d6d6d6
| 435320 ||  || — || October 17, 2007 || Mount Lemmon || Mount Lemmon Survey || NAE || align=right | 2.1 km || 
|-id=321 bgcolor=#d6d6d6
| 435321 ||  || — || October 31, 2007 || Mount Lemmon || Mount Lemmon Survey || — || align=right | 2.8 km || 
|-id=322 bgcolor=#d6d6d6
| 435322 ||  || — || October 20, 2007 || Mount Lemmon || Mount Lemmon Survey || — || align=right | 3.2 km || 
|-id=323 bgcolor=#FA8072
| 435323 ||  || — || November 3, 2007 || Dauban || Chante-Perdrix Obs. || — || align=right | 1.5 km || 
|-id=324 bgcolor=#FA8072
| 435324 ||  || — || October 19, 2007 || Socorro || LINEAR || — || align=right | 1.6 km || 
|-id=325 bgcolor=#E9E9E9
| 435325 ||  || — || November 2, 2007 || Catalina || CSS || — || align=right | 3.2 km || 
|-id=326 bgcolor=#d6d6d6
| 435326 ||  || — || October 31, 2007 || Mount Lemmon || Mount Lemmon Survey || — || align=right | 3.2 km || 
|-id=327 bgcolor=#d6d6d6
| 435327 ||  || — || October 7, 2007 || Mount Lemmon || Mount Lemmon Survey || — || align=right | 2.2 km || 
|-id=328 bgcolor=#E9E9E9
| 435328 ||  || — || October 10, 2007 || Kitt Peak || Spacewatch || — || align=right | 2.2 km || 
|-id=329 bgcolor=#d6d6d6
| 435329 ||  || — || September 26, 2007 || Mount Lemmon || Mount Lemmon Survey || TIR || align=right | 3.1 km || 
|-id=330 bgcolor=#d6d6d6
| 435330 ||  || — || October 11, 2007 || Kitt Peak || Spacewatch || — || align=right | 2.2 km || 
|-id=331 bgcolor=#d6d6d6
| 435331 ||  || — || November 3, 2007 || Kitt Peak || Spacewatch || EOS || align=right | 1.9 km || 
|-id=332 bgcolor=#d6d6d6
| 435332 ||  || — || October 16, 2007 || Catalina || CSS || — || align=right | 3.3 km || 
|-id=333 bgcolor=#d6d6d6
| 435333 ||  || — || November 1, 2007 || Kitt Peak || Spacewatch || — || align=right | 4.0 km || 
|-id=334 bgcolor=#d6d6d6
| 435334 ||  || — || November 1, 2007 || Kitt Peak || Spacewatch || — || align=right | 4.1 km || 
|-id=335 bgcolor=#d6d6d6
| 435335 ||  || — || November 1, 2007 || Kitt Peak || Spacewatch || EOS || align=right | 1.6 km || 
|-id=336 bgcolor=#d6d6d6
| 435336 ||  || — || November 1, 2007 || Kitt Peak || Spacewatch || — || align=right | 2.4 km || 
|-id=337 bgcolor=#d6d6d6
| 435337 ||  || — || November 1, 2007 || Kitt Peak || Spacewatch || — || align=right | 2.6 km || 
|-id=338 bgcolor=#d6d6d6
| 435338 ||  || — || November 3, 2007 || Mount Lemmon || Mount Lemmon Survey || EOS || align=right | 1.6 km || 
|-id=339 bgcolor=#d6d6d6
| 435339 ||  || — || November 3, 2007 || Kitt Peak || Spacewatch || EOS || align=right | 1.7 km || 
|-id=340 bgcolor=#d6d6d6
| 435340 ||  || — || November 3, 2007 || Kitt Peak || Spacewatch || — || align=right | 3.2 km || 
|-id=341 bgcolor=#d6d6d6
| 435341 ||  || — || October 30, 2007 || Kitt Peak || Spacewatch || — || align=right | 2.4 km || 
|-id=342 bgcolor=#E9E9E9
| 435342 ||  || — || November 3, 2007 || Kitt Peak || Spacewatch || — || align=right | 2.7 km || 
|-id=343 bgcolor=#d6d6d6
| 435343 ||  || — || November 5, 2007 || Kitt Peak || Spacewatch ||  || align=right | 2.8 km || 
|-id=344 bgcolor=#d6d6d6
| 435344 ||  || — || November 5, 2007 || Mount Lemmon || Mount Lemmon Survey || — || align=right | 2.7 km || 
|-id=345 bgcolor=#d6d6d6
| 435345 ||  || — || November 4, 2007 || Kitt Peak || Spacewatch || EOS || align=right | 1.9 km || 
|-id=346 bgcolor=#E9E9E9
| 435346 ||  || — || November 3, 2007 || Kitt Peak || Spacewatch || — || align=right | 1.8 km || 
|-id=347 bgcolor=#E9E9E9
| 435347 ||  || — || November 5, 2007 || Kitt Peak || Spacewatch || — || align=right | 2.4 km || 
|-id=348 bgcolor=#d6d6d6
| 435348 ||  || — || November 5, 2007 || Kitt Peak || Spacewatch || LIX || align=right | 3.2 km || 
|-id=349 bgcolor=#d6d6d6
| 435349 ||  || — || November 7, 2007 || Kitt Peak || Spacewatch || — || align=right | 2.6 km || 
|-id=350 bgcolor=#d6d6d6
| 435350 ||  || — || November 2, 2007 || Mount Lemmon || Mount Lemmon Survey || THM || align=right | 2.0 km || 
|-id=351 bgcolor=#d6d6d6
| 435351 ||  || — || October 12, 2007 || Kitt Peak || Spacewatch || — || align=right | 2.4 km || 
|-id=352 bgcolor=#d6d6d6
| 435352 ||  || — || October 8, 2007 || Kitt Peak || Spacewatch || — || align=right | 2.9 km || 
|-id=353 bgcolor=#d6d6d6
| 435353 ||  || — || September 9, 2007 || Mount Lemmon || Mount Lemmon Survey || EOS || align=right | 1.5 km || 
|-id=354 bgcolor=#E9E9E9
| 435354 ||  || — || October 14, 2007 || Mount Lemmon || Mount Lemmon Survey || — || align=right | 2.5 km || 
|-id=355 bgcolor=#d6d6d6
| 435355 ||  || — || November 5, 2007 || Kitt Peak || Spacewatch || — || align=right | 2.6 km || 
|-id=356 bgcolor=#d6d6d6
| 435356 ||  || — || October 17, 2007 || Mount Lemmon || Mount Lemmon Survey || — || align=right | 1.9 km || 
|-id=357 bgcolor=#d6d6d6
| 435357 ||  || — || November 7, 2007 || Kitt Peak || Spacewatch || — || align=right | 3.2 km || 
|-id=358 bgcolor=#d6d6d6
| 435358 ||  || — || September 18, 2007 || Mount Lemmon || Mount Lemmon Survey || THM || align=right | 2.3 km || 
|-id=359 bgcolor=#E9E9E9
| 435359 ||  || — || November 12, 2007 || Catalina || CSS || — || align=right | 2.8 km || 
|-id=360 bgcolor=#d6d6d6
| 435360 ||  || — || November 13, 2007 || Mount Lemmon || Mount Lemmon Survey || — || align=right | 2.5 km || 
|-id=361 bgcolor=#d6d6d6
| 435361 ||  || — || November 15, 2007 || Mount Lemmon || Mount Lemmon Survey || EOS || align=right | 1.7 km || 
|-id=362 bgcolor=#d6d6d6
| 435362 ||  || — || November 13, 2007 || Mount Lemmon || Mount Lemmon Survey || — || align=right | 2.0 km || 
|-id=363 bgcolor=#d6d6d6
| 435363 ||  || — || November 14, 2007 || Kitt Peak || Spacewatch || — || align=right | 3.7 km || 
|-id=364 bgcolor=#E9E9E9
| 435364 ||  || — || November 15, 2007 || Anderson Mesa || LONEOS || DOR || align=right | 2.7 km || 
|-id=365 bgcolor=#d6d6d6
| 435365 ||  || — || October 10, 2007 || Kitt Peak || Spacewatch || — || align=right | 3.1 km || 
|-id=366 bgcolor=#d6d6d6
| 435366 ||  || — || November 2, 2007 || Kitt Peak || Spacewatch || — || align=right | 2.1 km || 
|-id=367 bgcolor=#d6d6d6
| 435367 ||  || — || November 14, 2007 || Kitt Peak || Spacewatch || — || align=right | 2.5 km || 
|-id=368 bgcolor=#d6d6d6
| 435368 ||  || — || November 14, 2007 || Kitt Peak || Spacewatch || — || align=right | 3.5 km || 
|-id=369 bgcolor=#d6d6d6
| 435369 ||  || — || November 2, 2007 || Mount Lemmon || Mount Lemmon Survey || — || align=right | 2.9 km || 
|-id=370 bgcolor=#d6d6d6
| 435370 ||  || — || November 7, 2007 || Kitt Peak || Spacewatch || — || align=right | 3.2 km || 
|-id=371 bgcolor=#d6d6d6
| 435371 ||  || — || November 11, 2007 || Mount Lemmon || Mount Lemmon Survey || — || align=right | 3.2 km || 
|-id=372 bgcolor=#d6d6d6
| 435372 ||  || — || November 2, 2007 || Mount Lemmon || Mount Lemmon Survey || — || align=right | 2.4 km || 
|-id=373 bgcolor=#d6d6d6
| 435373 ||  || — || January 27, 1998 || Caussols || ODAS || — || align=right | 3.8 km || 
|-id=374 bgcolor=#d6d6d6
| 435374 ||  || — || November 1, 2007 || Kitt Peak || Spacewatch || — || align=right | 2.5 km || 
|-id=375 bgcolor=#d6d6d6
| 435375 ||  || — || November 4, 2007 || Mount Lemmon || Mount Lemmon Survey || — || align=right | 4.6 km || 
|-id=376 bgcolor=#d6d6d6
| 435376 ||  || — || November 4, 2007 || Kitt Peak || Spacewatch || — || align=right | 2.8 km || 
|-id=377 bgcolor=#d6d6d6
| 435377 ||  || — || November 1, 2007 || Kitt Peak || Spacewatch || — || align=right | 2.4 km || 
|-id=378 bgcolor=#d6d6d6
| 435378 ||  || — || November 2, 2007 || Mount Lemmon || Mount Lemmon Survey || — || align=right | 3.3 km || 
|-id=379 bgcolor=#E9E9E9
| 435379 ||  || — || November 18, 2007 || Mount Lemmon || Mount Lemmon Survey ||  || align=right | 2.4 km || 
|-id=380 bgcolor=#d6d6d6
| 435380 ||  || — || November 18, 2007 || Mount Lemmon || Mount Lemmon Survey || — || align=right | 2.3 km || 
|-id=381 bgcolor=#d6d6d6
| 435381 ||  || — || December 8, 2007 || La Sagra || OAM Obs. || — || align=right | 6.1 km || 
|-id=382 bgcolor=#E9E9E9
| 435382 ||  || — || September 15, 2007 || Mount Lemmon || Mount Lemmon Survey || — || align=right | 2.6 km || 
|-id=383 bgcolor=#E9E9E9
| 435383 ||  || — || November 8, 2007 || Socorro || LINEAR || — || align=right | 3.5 km || 
|-id=384 bgcolor=#d6d6d6
| 435384 ||  || — || December 15, 2007 || Kitt Peak || Spacewatch || — || align=right | 2.6 km || 
|-id=385 bgcolor=#fefefe
| 435385 ||  || — || December 15, 2007 || Kitt Peak || Spacewatch || — || align=right data-sort-value="0.55" | 550 m || 
|-id=386 bgcolor=#d6d6d6
| 435386 ||  || — || October 9, 2007 || Kitt Peak || Spacewatch || — || align=right | 3.6 km || 
|-id=387 bgcolor=#d6d6d6
| 435387 ||  || — || December 3, 2007 || Kitt Peak || Spacewatch || — || align=right | 3.5 km || 
|-id=388 bgcolor=#d6d6d6
| 435388 ||  || — || December 4, 2007 || Mount Lemmon || Mount Lemmon Survey || — || align=right | 2.8 km || 
|-id=389 bgcolor=#d6d6d6
| 435389 ||  || — || November 2, 2007 || Mount Lemmon || Mount Lemmon Survey || — || align=right | 4.0 km || 
|-id=390 bgcolor=#d6d6d6
| 435390 ||  || — || November 11, 2007 || Mount Lemmon || Mount Lemmon Survey || — || align=right | 2.7 km || 
|-id=391 bgcolor=#d6d6d6
| 435391 ||  || — || December 16, 2007 || Kitt Peak || Spacewatch || — || align=right | 2.4 km || 
|-id=392 bgcolor=#d6d6d6
| 435392 ||  || — || November 12, 2007 || Mount Lemmon || Mount Lemmon Survey || VER || align=right | 2.9 km || 
|-id=393 bgcolor=#d6d6d6
| 435393 ||  || — || December 18, 2007 || Mount Lemmon || Mount Lemmon Survey || VER || align=right | 3.0 km || 
|-id=394 bgcolor=#d6d6d6
| 435394 ||  || — || December 19, 2007 || Kitt Peak || Spacewatch || — || align=right | 2.7 km || 
|-id=395 bgcolor=#d6d6d6
| 435395 ||  || — || December 28, 2007 || Junk Bond || D. Healy || Tj (2.92) || align=right | 4.6 km || 
|-id=396 bgcolor=#d6d6d6
| 435396 ||  || — || December 30, 2007 || Kitt Peak || Spacewatch || — || align=right | 2.7 km || 
|-id=397 bgcolor=#d6d6d6
| 435397 ||  || — || December 30, 2007 || Kitt Peak || Spacewatch || — || align=right | 2.5 km || 
|-id=398 bgcolor=#d6d6d6
| 435398 ||  || — || December 31, 2007 || Kitt Peak || Spacewatch ||  || align=right | 3.0 km || 
|-id=399 bgcolor=#d6d6d6
| 435399 ||  || — || December 31, 2007 || Lulin Observatory || LUSS || — || align=right | 3.9 km || 
|-id=400 bgcolor=#d6d6d6
| 435400 ||  || — || December 30, 2007 || Mount Lemmon || Mount Lemmon Survey || — || align=right | 4.2 km || 
|}

435401–435500 

|-bgcolor=#d6d6d6
| 435401 ||  || — || December 30, 2007 || Mount Lemmon || Mount Lemmon Survey || — || align=right | 2.8 km || 
|-id=402 bgcolor=#fefefe
| 435402 ||  || — || January 10, 2008 || Mount Lemmon || Mount Lemmon Survey || NYS || align=right data-sort-value="0.55" | 550 m || 
|-id=403 bgcolor=#d6d6d6
| 435403 ||  || — || January 10, 2008 || Mount Lemmon || Mount Lemmon Survey || — || align=right | 2.9 km || 
|-id=404 bgcolor=#FFC2E0
| 435404 ||  || — || January 10, 2008 || Kitt Peak || Spacewatch || AMO || align=right data-sort-value="0.92" | 920 m || 
|-id=405 bgcolor=#d6d6d6
| 435405 ||  || — || January 11, 2008 || Desert Eagle || W. K. Y. Yeung || — || align=right | 3.1 km || 
|-id=406 bgcolor=#d6d6d6
| 435406 ||  || — || December 4, 2007 || Mount Lemmon || Mount Lemmon Survey || — || align=right | 3.9 km || 
|-id=407 bgcolor=#d6d6d6
| 435407 ||  || — || December 15, 2007 || Mount Lemmon || Mount Lemmon Survey || — || align=right | 3.2 km || 
|-id=408 bgcolor=#d6d6d6
| 435408 ||  || — || January 11, 2008 || Kitt Peak || Spacewatch || — || align=right | 2.8 km || 
|-id=409 bgcolor=#fefefe
| 435409 ||  || — || January 11, 2008 || Mount Lemmon || Mount Lemmon Survey || — || align=right data-sort-value="0.56" | 560 m || 
|-id=410 bgcolor=#d6d6d6
| 435410 ||  || — || November 11, 2007 || Mount Lemmon || Mount Lemmon Survey || — || align=right | 3.1 km || 
|-id=411 bgcolor=#d6d6d6
| 435411 ||  || — || November 11, 2007 || Mount Lemmon || Mount Lemmon Survey || — || align=right | 3.2 km || 
|-id=412 bgcolor=#d6d6d6
| 435412 ||  || — || December 31, 2007 || Mount Lemmon || Mount Lemmon Survey || HYG || align=right | 2.5 km || 
|-id=413 bgcolor=#d6d6d6
| 435413 ||  || — || January 14, 2008 || Kitt Peak || Spacewatch || — || align=right | 3.4 km || 
|-id=414 bgcolor=#fefefe
| 435414 ||  || — || September 18, 2003 || Kitt Peak || Spacewatch || — || align=right data-sort-value="0.71" | 710 m || 
|-id=415 bgcolor=#d6d6d6
| 435415 ||  || — || December 31, 2007 || Kitt Peak || Spacewatch || EOS || align=right | 2.4 km || 
|-id=416 bgcolor=#fefefe
| 435416 ||  || — || January 10, 2008 || Kitt Peak || Spacewatch || — || align=right data-sort-value="0.71" | 710 m || 
|-id=417 bgcolor=#fefefe
| 435417 ||  || — || January 12, 2008 || Mount Lemmon || Mount Lemmon Survey || — || align=right data-sort-value="0.89" | 890 m || 
|-id=418 bgcolor=#d6d6d6
| 435418 ||  || — || November 23, 2006 || Mount Lemmon || Mount Lemmon Survey || — || align=right | 3.6 km || 
|-id=419 bgcolor=#fefefe
| 435419 ||  || — || January 30, 2008 || Kitt Peak || Spacewatch || — || align=right data-sort-value="0.74" | 740 m || 
|-id=420 bgcolor=#d6d6d6
| 435420 ||  || — || November 13, 2006 || Catalina || CSS || — || align=right | 3.6 km || 
|-id=421 bgcolor=#d6d6d6
| 435421 ||  || — || January 18, 2008 || Kitt Peak || Spacewatch || — || align=right | 3.2 km || 
|-id=422 bgcolor=#fefefe
| 435422 ||  || — || January 30, 2008 || Mount Lemmon || Mount Lemmon Survey || — || align=right data-sort-value="0.64" | 640 m || 
|-id=423 bgcolor=#d6d6d6
| 435423 ||  || — || February 6, 2008 || Socorro || LINEAR || LIX || align=right | 4.4 km || 
|-id=424 bgcolor=#d6d6d6
| 435424 ||  || — || January 11, 2008 || Mount Lemmon || Mount Lemmon Survey || VER || align=right | 2.8 km || 
|-id=425 bgcolor=#d6d6d6
| 435425 ||  || — || January 14, 2008 || Kitt Peak || Spacewatch || — || align=right | 2.9 km || 
|-id=426 bgcolor=#d6d6d6
| 435426 ||  || — || January 10, 2008 || Mount Lemmon || Mount Lemmon Survey || — || align=right | 2.5 km || 
|-id=427 bgcolor=#fefefe
| 435427 ||  || — || February 2, 2008 || Kitt Peak || Spacewatch || — || align=right data-sort-value="0.53" | 530 m || 
|-id=428 bgcolor=#fefefe
| 435428 ||  || — || January 15, 2008 || Mount Lemmon || Mount Lemmon Survey || — || align=right data-sort-value="0.56" | 560 m || 
|-id=429 bgcolor=#fefefe
| 435429 ||  || — || February 6, 2008 || Anderson Mesa || LONEOS || — || align=right data-sort-value="0.82" | 820 m || 
|-id=430 bgcolor=#fefefe
| 435430 ||  || — || February 7, 2008 || Kitt Peak || Spacewatch || — || align=right data-sort-value="0.54" | 540 m || 
|-id=431 bgcolor=#fefefe
| 435431 ||  || — || November 7, 2007 || Mount Lemmon || Mount Lemmon Survey || — || align=right data-sort-value="0.87" | 870 m || 
|-id=432 bgcolor=#d6d6d6
| 435432 ||  || — || February 7, 2008 || Mount Lemmon || Mount Lemmon Survey || — || align=right | 3.0 km || 
|-id=433 bgcolor=#d6d6d6
| 435433 ||  || — || January 15, 2008 || Mount Lemmon || Mount Lemmon Survey || — || align=right | 3.5 km || 
|-id=434 bgcolor=#d6d6d6
| 435434 ||  || — || February 8, 2008 || Kitt Peak || Spacewatch || 7:4 || align=right | 2.6 km || 
|-id=435 bgcolor=#fefefe
| 435435 ||  || — || February 8, 2008 || Mount Lemmon || Mount Lemmon Survey || — || align=right data-sort-value="0.65" | 650 m || 
|-id=436 bgcolor=#fefefe
| 435436 ||  || — || February 9, 2008 || Kitt Peak || Spacewatch || — || align=right data-sort-value="0.74" | 740 m || 
|-id=437 bgcolor=#fefefe
| 435437 ||  || — || February 9, 2008 || Kitt Peak || Spacewatch || — || align=right data-sort-value="0.76" | 760 m || 
|-id=438 bgcolor=#fefefe
| 435438 ||  || — || December 28, 2007 || Kitt Peak || Spacewatch || — || align=right data-sort-value="0.62" | 620 m || 
|-id=439 bgcolor=#fefefe
| 435439 ||  || — || February 12, 2008 || Mount Lemmon || Mount Lemmon Survey || — || align=right data-sort-value="0.77" | 770 m || 
|-id=440 bgcolor=#fefefe
| 435440 ||  || — || February 1, 2008 || Kitt Peak || Spacewatch || — || align=right data-sort-value="0.67" | 670 m || 
|-id=441 bgcolor=#FFC2E0
| 435441 ||  || — || February 28, 2008 || Mount Lemmon || Mount Lemmon Survey || APO || align=right data-sort-value="0.36" | 360 m || 
|-id=442 bgcolor=#fefefe
| 435442 ||  || — || February 24, 2008 || Kitt Peak || Spacewatch || — || align=right data-sort-value="0.80" | 800 m || 
|-id=443 bgcolor=#fefefe
| 435443 ||  || — || February 7, 2008 || Kitt Peak || Spacewatch || — || align=right data-sort-value="0.71" | 710 m || 
|-id=444 bgcolor=#fefefe
| 435444 ||  || — || February 28, 2008 || Mount Lemmon || Mount Lemmon Survey || — || align=right data-sort-value="0.68" | 680 m || 
|-id=445 bgcolor=#fefefe
| 435445 ||  || — || February 26, 2008 || Kitt Peak || Spacewatch || — || align=right data-sort-value="0.93" | 930 m || 
|-id=446 bgcolor=#fefefe
| 435446 ||  || — || February 29, 2008 || Kitt Peak || Spacewatch || — || align=right data-sort-value="0.67" | 670 m || 
|-id=447 bgcolor=#fefefe
| 435447 ||  || — || February 29, 2008 || Kitt Peak || Spacewatch || — || align=right data-sort-value="0.64" | 640 m || 
|-id=448 bgcolor=#fefefe
| 435448 ||  || — || February 8, 2008 || Mount Lemmon || Mount Lemmon Survey || — || align=right data-sort-value="0.68" | 680 m || 
|-id=449 bgcolor=#fefefe
| 435449 ||  || — || February 27, 2008 || Kitt Peak || Spacewatch || — || align=right data-sort-value="0.60" | 600 m || 
|-id=450 bgcolor=#d6d6d6
| 435450 ||  || — || January 15, 2008 || Mount Lemmon || Mount Lemmon Survey || — || align=right | 3.7 km || 
|-id=451 bgcolor=#fefefe
| 435451 ||  || — || February 27, 2008 || Kitt Peak || Spacewatch || — || align=right data-sort-value="0.56" | 560 m || 
|-id=452 bgcolor=#fefefe
| 435452 ||  || — || March 5, 2008 || Mount Lemmon || Mount Lemmon Survey || — || align=right data-sort-value="0.94" | 940 m || 
|-id=453 bgcolor=#fefefe
| 435453 ||  || — || March 8, 2008 || Kitt Peak || Spacewatch || — || align=right data-sort-value="0.60" | 600 m || 
|-id=454 bgcolor=#fefefe
| 435454 ||  || — || March 9, 2008 || Mount Lemmon || Mount Lemmon Survey || — || align=right data-sort-value="0.69" | 690 m || 
|-id=455 bgcolor=#fefefe
| 435455 ||  || — || March 11, 2008 || Catalina || CSS || — || align=right data-sort-value="0.65" | 650 m || 
|-id=456 bgcolor=#fefefe
| 435456 ||  || — || March 12, 2008 || Kitt Peak || Spacewatch || — || align=right data-sort-value="0.64" | 640 m || 
|-id=457 bgcolor=#fefefe
| 435457 ||  || — || March 1, 2008 || Kitt Peak || Spacewatch || — || align=right data-sort-value="0.78" | 780 m || 
|-id=458 bgcolor=#fefefe
| 435458 ||  || — || March 5, 2008 || Kitt Peak || Spacewatch || — || align=right data-sort-value="0.78" | 780 m || 
|-id=459 bgcolor=#fefefe
| 435459 ||  || — || March 4, 2008 || Mount Lemmon || Mount Lemmon Survey || — || align=right data-sort-value="0.81" | 810 m || 
|-id=460 bgcolor=#fefefe
| 435460 ||  || — || March 9, 2008 || Kitt Peak || Spacewatch || — || align=right data-sort-value="0.60" | 600 m || 
|-id=461 bgcolor=#fefefe
| 435461 ||  || — || March 25, 2008 || Kitt Peak || Spacewatch || — || align=right data-sort-value="0.72" | 720 m || 
|-id=462 bgcolor=#fefefe
| 435462 ||  || — || March 26, 2008 || Mount Lemmon || Mount Lemmon Survey || V || align=right data-sort-value="0.72" | 720 m || 
|-id=463 bgcolor=#fefefe
| 435463 ||  || — || March 26, 2008 || Kitt Peak || Spacewatch || — || align=right data-sort-value="0.60" | 600 m || 
|-id=464 bgcolor=#fefefe
| 435464 ||  || — || March 27, 2008 || Kitt Peak || Spacewatch || — || align=right | 1.0 km || 
|-id=465 bgcolor=#fefefe
| 435465 ||  || — || March 10, 2008 || Mount Lemmon || Mount Lemmon Survey || critical || align=right data-sort-value="0.65" | 650 m || 
|-id=466 bgcolor=#fefefe
| 435466 ||  || — || March 4, 2008 || Mount Lemmon || Mount Lemmon Survey || — || align=right data-sort-value="0.80" | 800 m || 
|-id=467 bgcolor=#fefefe
| 435467 ||  || — || March 28, 2008 || Kitt Peak || Spacewatch || — || align=right data-sort-value="0.71" | 710 m || 
|-id=468 bgcolor=#fefefe
| 435468 ||  || — || March 28, 2008 || Mount Lemmon || Mount Lemmon Survey || — || align=right data-sort-value="0.59" | 590 m || 
|-id=469 bgcolor=#fefefe
| 435469 ||  || — || March 28, 2008 || Kitt Peak || Spacewatch || — || align=right data-sort-value="0.68" | 680 m || 
|-id=470 bgcolor=#fefefe
| 435470 ||  || — || March 5, 2008 || Mount Lemmon || Mount Lemmon Survey || — || align=right data-sort-value="0.63" | 630 m || 
|-id=471 bgcolor=#fefefe
| 435471 ||  || — || March 28, 2008 || Mount Lemmon || Mount Lemmon Survey || — || align=right data-sort-value="0.83" | 830 m || 
|-id=472 bgcolor=#fefefe
| 435472 ||  || — || March 31, 2008 || Mount Lemmon || Mount Lemmon Survey || — || align=right data-sort-value="0.70" | 700 m || 
|-id=473 bgcolor=#fefefe
| 435473 ||  || — || March 10, 2008 || Kitt Peak || Spacewatch || — || align=right data-sort-value="0.57" | 570 m || 
|-id=474 bgcolor=#fefefe
| 435474 ||  || — || March 30, 2008 || Kitt Peak || Spacewatch || — || align=right data-sort-value="0.62" | 620 m || 
|-id=475 bgcolor=#fefefe
| 435475 ||  || — || March 30, 2008 || Kitt Peak || Spacewatch || — || align=right data-sort-value="0.71" | 710 m || 
|-id=476 bgcolor=#fefefe
| 435476 ||  || — || March 30, 2008 || Kitt Peak || Spacewatch || — || align=right data-sort-value="0.60" | 600 m || 
|-id=477 bgcolor=#fefefe
| 435477 ||  || — || March 31, 2008 || Kitt Peak || Spacewatch || — || align=right data-sort-value="0.60" | 600 m || 
|-id=478 bgcolor=#fefefe
| 435478 ||  || — || March 31, 2008 || Mount Lemmon || Mount Lemmon Survey || — || align=right data-sort-value="0.88" | 880 m || 
|-id=479 bgcolor=#fefefe
| 435479 ||  || — || March 31, 2008 || Mount Lemmon || Mount Lemmon Survey || — || align=right data-sort-value="0.70" | 700 m || 
|-id=480 bgcolor=#fefefe
| 435480 ||  || — || March 26, 2008 || Kitt Peak || Spacewatch || — || align=right data-sort-value="0.75" | 750 m || 
|-id=481 bgcolor=#fefefe
| 435481 ||  || — || March 30, 2008 || Kitt Peak || Spacewatch || — || align=right data-sort-value="0.64" | 640 m || 
|-id=482 bgcolor=#fefefe
| 435482 ||  || — || March 29, 2008 || Mount Lemmon || Mount Lemmon Survey || — || align=right data-sort-value="0.72" | 720 m || 
|-id=483 bgcolor=#fefefe
| 435483 ||  || — || March 29, 2008 || Kitt Peak || Spacewatch || (2076) || align=right data-sort-value="0.68" | 680 m || 
|-id=484 bgcolor=#fefefe
| 435484 ||  || — || March 11, 2008 || Catalina || CSS || — || align=right data-sort-value="0.91" | 910 m || 
|-id=485 bgcolor=#d6d6d6
| 435485 ||  || — || February 10, 2008 || Kitt Peak || Spacewatch || 7:4 || align=right | 3.1 km || 
|-id=486 bgcolor=#fefefe
| 435486 ||  || — || March 27, 2008 || Kitt Peak || Spacewatch || — || align=right data-sort-value="0.68" | 680 m || 
|-id=487 bgcolor=#fefefe
| 435487 ||  || — || April 1, 2008 || Kitt Peak || Spacewatch || — || align=right data-sort-value="0.67" | 670 m || 
|-id=488 bgcolor=#fefefe
| 435488 ||  || — || April 1, 2008 || Kitt Peak || Spacewatch || — || align=right | 1.0 km || 
|-id=489 bgcolor=#fefefe
| 435489 ||  || — || April 3, 2008 || Kitt Peak || Spacewatch || — || align=right data-sort-value="0.64" | 640 m || 
|-id=490 bgcolor=#fefefe
| 435490 ||  || — || April 3, 2008 || Kitt Peak || Spacewatch || — || align=right data-sort-value="0.84" | 840 m || 
|-id=491 bgcolor=#fefefe
| 435491 ||  || — || April 4, 2008 || Mount Lemmon || Mount Lemmon Survey || — || align=right data-sort-value="0.72" | 720 m || 
|-id=492 bgcolor=#fefefe
| 435492 ||  || — || April 5, 2008 || Kitt Peak || Spacewatch || — || align=right data-sort-value="0.67" | 670 m || 
|-id=493 bgcolor=#fefefe
| 435493 ||  || — || March 30, 2008 || Kitt Peak || Spacewatch || — || align=right data-sort-value="0.57" | 570 m || 
|-id=494 bgcolor=#fefefe
| 435494 ||  || — || April 7, 2008 || Kitt Peak || Spacewatch || MAS || align=right data-sort-value="0.63" | 630 m || 
|-id=495 bgcolor=#fefefe
| 435495 ||  || — || April 7, 2008 || Kitt Peak || Spacewatch || — || align=right data-sort-value="0.75" | 750 m || 
|-id=496 bgcolor=#fefefe
| 435496 ||  || — || April 7, 2008 || Kitt Peak || Spacewatch || — || align=right data-sort-value="0.68" | 680 m || 
|-id=497 bgcolor=#fefefe
| 435497 ||  || — || April 3, 2008 || Kitt Peak || Spacewatch || — || align=right data-sort-value="0.65" | 650 m || 
|-id=498 bgcolor=#fefefe
| 435498 ||  || — || March 5, 2008 || Kitt Peak || Spacewatch || — || align=right data-sort-value="0.60" | 600 m || 
|-id=499 bgcolor=#fefefe
| 435499 ||  || — || March 28, 2008 || Kitt Peak || Spacewatch || — || align=right data-sort-value="0.82" | 820 m || 
|-id=500 bgcolor=#fefefe
| 435500 ||  || — || April 9, 2008 || Kitt Peak || Spacewatch || — || align=right data-sort-value="0.59" | 590 m || 
|}

435501–435600 

|-bgcolor=#fefefe
| 435501 ||  || — || March 11, 2008 || Catalina || CSS || — || align=right data-sort-value="0.86" | 860 m || 
|-id=502 bgcolor=#fefefe
| 435502 ||  || — || April 13, 2008 || Kitt Peak || Spacewatch || (2076) || align=right data-sort-value="0.70" | 700 m || 
|-id=503 bgcolor=#fefefe
| 435503 ||  || — || April 13, 2008 || Kitt Peak || Spacewatch || — || align=right data-sort-value="0.59" | 590 m || 
|-id=504 bgcolor=#fefefe
| 435504 ||  || — || April 14, 2008 || Kitt Peak || Spacewatch || — || align=right data-sort-value="0.72" | 720 m || 
|-id=505 bgcolor=#fefefe
| 435505 ||  || — || April 24, 2008 || Mount Lemmon || Mount Lemmon Survey || Vcritical || align=right data-sort-value="0.59" | 590 m || 
|-id=506 bgcolor=#fefefe
| 435506 ||  || — || April 10, 2008 || Kitt Peak || Spacewatch || — || align=right data-sort-value="0.80" | 800 m || 
|-id=507 bgcolor=#fefefe
| 435507 ||  || — || April 25, 2008 || Kitt Peak || Spacewatch || — || align=right data-sort-value="0.68" | 680 m || 
|-id=508 bgcolor=#fefefe
| 435508 ||  || — || March 10, 2008 || Kitt Peak || Spacewatch || — || align=right data-sort-value="0.62" | 620 m || 
|-id=509 bgcolor=#fefefe
| 435509 ||  || — || April 28, 2008 || Kitt Peak || Spacewatch || — || align=right data-sort-value="0.68" | 680 m || 
|-id=510 bgcolor=#fefefe
| 435510 ||  || — || April 28, 2008 || Kitt Peak || Spacewatch || — || align=right data-sort-value="0.72" | 720 m || 
|-id=511 bgcolor=#fefefe
| 435511 ||  || — || April 26, 2008 || Mount Lemmon || Mount Lemmon Survey || — || align=right data-sort-value="0.71" | 710 m || 
|-id=512 bgcolor=#fefefe
| 435512 ||  || — || April 28, 2008 || Kitt Peak || Spacewatch || — || align=right data-sort-value="0.57" | 570 m || 
|-id=513 bgcolor=#fefefe
| 435513 ||  || — || April 29, 2008 || Kitt Peak || Spacewatch || — || align=right data-sort-value="0.68" | 680 m || 
|-id=514 bgcolor=#fefefe
| 435514 ||  || — || April 30, 2008 || Kitt Peak || Spacewatch || V || align=right data-sort-value="0.62" | 620 m || 
|-id=515 bgcolor=#fefefe
| 435515 ||  || — || April 26, 2008 || Kitt Peak || Spacewatch || — || align=right data-sort-value="0.81" | 810 m || 
|-id=516 bgcolor=#fefefe
| 435516 ||  || — || May 3, 2008 || Kitt Peak || Spacewatch || — || align=right data-sort-value="0.68" | 680 m || 
|-id=517 bgcolor=#fefefe
| 435517 ||  || — || April 8, 2008 || Kitt Peak || Spacewatch || — || align=right data-sort-value="0.64" | 640 m || 
|-id=518 bgcolor=#fefefe
| 435518 ||  || — || May 3, 2008 || Kitt Peak || Spacewatch || — || align=right data-sort-value="0.59" | 590 m || 
|-id=519 bgcolor=#fefefe
| 435519 ||  || — || May 2, 2008 || Kitt Peak || Spacewatch || — || align=right data-sort-value="0.62" | 620 m || 
|-id=520 bgcolor=#fefefe
| 435520 ||  || — || May 3, 2008 || Mount Lemmon || Mount Lemmon Survey || — || align=right data-sort-value="0.54" | 540 m || 
|-id=521 bgcolor=#fefefe
| 435521 ||  || — || April 15, 2008 || Mount Lemmon || Mount Lemmon Survey || — || align=right data-sort-value="0.75" | 750 m || 
|-id=522 bgcolor=#fefefe
| 435522 ||  || — || May 4, 2008 || Kitt Peak || Spacewatch || — || align=right data-sort-value="0.60" | 600 m || 
|-id=523 bgcolor=#fefefe
| 435523 ||  || — || May 27, 2008 || Kitt Peak || Spacewatch || — || align=right data-sort-value="0.98" | 980 m || 
|-id=524 bgcolor=#fefefe
| 435524 ||  || — || May 3, 2008 || Kitt Peak || Spacewatch || — || align=right data-sort-value="0.57" | 570 m || 
|-id=525 bgcolor=#fefefe
| 435525 ||  || — || May 27, 2008 || Kitt Peak || Spacewatch || — || align=right data-sort-value="0.71" | 710 m || 
|-id=526 bgcolor=#fefefe
| 435526 ||  || — || May 27, 2008 || Kitt Peak || Spacewatch || V || align=right data-sort-value="0.63" | 630 m || 
|-id=527 bgcolor=#fefefe
| 435527 ||  || — || April 28, 2008 || Kitt Peak || Spacewatch || — || align=right data-sort-value="0.65" | 650 m || 
|-id=528 bgcolor=#fefefe
| 435528 ||  || — || May 29, 2008 || Mount Lemmon || Mount Lemmon Survey || — || align=right data-sort-value="0.82" | 820 m || 
|-id=529 bgcolor=#fefefe
| 435529 ||  || — || May 29, 2008 || Mount Lemmon || Mount Lemmon Survey || — || align=right data-sort-value="0.75" | 750 m || 
|-id=530 bgcolor=#fefefe
| 435530 ||  || — || May 4, 2008 || Kitt Peak || Spacewatch || — || align=right data-sort-value="0.75" | 750 m || 
|-id=531 bgcolor=#fefefe
| 435531 ||  || — || May 27, 2008 || Kitt Peak || Spacewatch || — || align=right data-sort-value="0.90" | 900 m || 
|-id=532 bgcolor=#fefefe
| 435532 ||  || — || May 27, 2008 || Kitt Peak || Spacewatch || — || align=right data-sort-value="0.64" | 640 m || 
|-id=533 bgcolor=#fefefe
| 435533 ||  || — || April 24, 2008 || Kitt Peak || Spacewatch || V || align=right data-sort-value="0.48" | 480 m || 
|-id=534 bgcolor=#fefefe
| 435534 ||  || — || May 13, 2008 || Mount Lemmon || Mount Lemmon Survey || — || align=right data-sort-value="0.78" | 780 m || 
|-id=535 bgcolor=#fefefe
| 435535 ||  || — || May 26, 2008 || Kitt Peak || Spacewatch || — || align=right data-sort-value="0.90" | 900 m || 
|-id=536 bgcolor=#fefefe
| 435536 ||  || — || June 10, 2008 || Kitt Peak || Spacewatch || — || align=right data-sort-value="0.81" | 810 m || 
|-id=537 bgcolor=#fefefe
| 435537 ||  || — || June 30, 2008 || Kitt Peak || Spacewatch || — || align=right data-sort-value="0.71" | 710 m || 
|-id=538 bgcolor=#E9E9E9
| 435538 ||  || — || July 2, 2008 || Kitt Peak || Spacewatch || ADE || align=right | 1.8 km || 
|-id=539 bgcolor=#fefefe
| 435539 ||  || — || July 25, 2008 || La Sagra || OAM Obs. || — || align=right data-sort-value="0.80" | 800 m || 
|-id=540 bgcolor=#d6d6d6
| 435540 ||  || — || June 14, 2008 || Kitt Peak || Spacewatch || 3:2 || align=right | 5.3 km || 
|-id=541 bgcolor=#FA8072
| 435541 ||  || — || July 27, 2008 || Bisei SG Center || BATTeRS || — || align=right data-sort-value="0.86" | 860 m || 
|-id=542 bgcolor=#E9E9E9
| 435542 ||  || — || July 30, 2008 || Kitt Peak || Spacewatch || — || align=right data-sort-value="0.75" | 750 m || 
|-id=543 bgcolor=#fefefe
| 435543 ||  || — || July 25, 2008 || Siding Spring || SSS || — || align=right data-sort-value="0.95" | 950 m || 
|-id=544 bgcolor=#E9E9E9
| 435544 ||  || — || July 30, 2008 || Kitt Peak || Spacewatch || EUN || align=right | 1.0 km || 
|-id=545 bgcolor=#fefefe
| 435545 ||  || — || July 30, 2008 || Catalina || CSS || — || align=right data-sort-value="0.81" | 810 m || 
|-id=546 bgcolor=#d6d6d6
| 435546 ||  || — || July 29, 2008 || Mount Lemmon || Mount Lemmon Survey || — || align=right | 2.9 km || 
|-id=547 bgcolor=#fefefe
| 435547 ||  || — || August 5, 2008 || Hibiscus || S. F. Hönig, N. Teamo || — || align=right | 1.1 km || 
|-id=548 bgcolor=#FFC2E0
| 435548 ||  || — || August 24, 2008 || Črni Vrh || Črni Vrh || APOPHAcritical || align=right data-sort-value="0.62" | 620 m || 
|-id=549 bgcolor=#fefefe
| 435549 ||  || — || August 24, 2008 || Vicques || M. Ory || NYS || align=right data-sort-value="0.72" | 720 m || 
|-id=550 bgcolor=#fefefe
| 435550 ||  || — || August 21, 2008 || Kitt Peak || Spacewatch || — || align=right data-sort-value="0.67" | 670 m || 
|-id=551 bgcolor=#fefefe
| 435551 ||  || — || August 7, 2008 || Kitt Peak || Spacewatch || NYS || align=right data-sort-value="0.60" | 600 m || 
|-id=552 bgcolor=#E9E9E9
| 435552 Morin ||  ||  || August 27, 2008 || Pises || Pises Obs. || — || align=right | 2.0 km || 
|-id=553 bgcolor=#fefefe
| 435553 ||  || — || August 24, 2008 || La Sagra || OAM Obs. || — || align=right data-sort-value="0.89" | 890 m || 
|-id=554 bgcolor=#fefefe
| 435554 ||  || — || August 21, 2008 || Kitt Peak || Spacewatch || NYS || align=right data-sort-value="0.56" | 560 m || 
|-id=555 bgcolor=#fefefe
| 435555 ||  || — || August 23, 2008 || Kitt Peak || Spacewatch || — || align=right data-sort-value="0.89" | 890 m || 
|-id=556 bgcolor=#fefefe
| 435556 ||  || — || August 27, 2008 || La Sagra || OAM Obs. || — || align=right data-sort-value="0.78" | 780 m || 
|-id=557 bgcolor=#fefefe
| 435557 ||  || — || August 27, 2008 || La Sagra || OAM Obs. || — || align=right data-sort-value="0.77" | 770 m || 
|-id=558 bgcolor=#fefefe
| 435558 ||  || — || September 2, 2008 || Kitt Peak || Spacewatch || — || align=right data-sort-value="0.73" | 730 m || 
|-id=559 bgcolor=#E9E9E9
| 435559 ||  || — || September 2, 2008 || Kitt Peak || Spacewatch || — || align=right data-sort-value="0.85" | 850 m || 
|-id=560 bgcolor=#C2FFFF
| 435560 ||  || — || September 3, 2008 || Kitt Peak || Spacewatch || L4 || align=right | 7.4 km || 
|-id=561 bgcolor=#fefefe
| 435561 ||  || — || September 5, 2008 || Junk Bond || D. Healy || MAScritical || align=right data-sort-value="0.65" | 650 m || 
|-id=562 bgcolor=#fefefe
| 435562 ||  || — || September 1, 2008 || Siding Spring || SSS || — || align=right | 1.1 km || 
|-id=563 bgcolor=#E9E9E9
| 435563 ||  || — || September 2, 2008 || Kitt Peak || Spacewatch || — || align=right | 1.9 km || 
|-id=564 bgcolor=#fefefe
| 435564 ||  || — || September 2, 2008 || Kitt Peak || Spacewatch || MAS || align=right data-sort-value="0.78" | 780 m || 
|-id=565 bgcolor=#E9E9E9
| 435565 ||  || — || September 2, 2008 || Kitt Peak || Spacewatch || KON || align=right | 2.3 km || 
|-id=566 bgcolor=#fefefe
| 435566 ||  || — || September 2, 2008 || Kitt Peak || Spacewatch || NYS || align=right data-sort-value="0.62" | 620 m || 
|-id=567 bgcolor=#C2FFFF
| 435567 ||  || — || July 29, 2008 || Mount Lemmon || Mount Lemmon Survey || L4 || align=right | 9.4 km || 
|-id=568 bgcolor=#C2FFFF
| 435568 ||  || — || September 3, 2008 || Kitt Peak || Spacewatch || L4 || align=right | 8.3 km || 
|-id=569 bgcolor=#E9E9E9
| 435569 ||  || — || September 4, 2008 || Kitt Peak || Spacewatch || — || align=right | 1.9 km || 
|-id=570 bgcolor=#E9E9E9
| 435570 ||  || — || September 4, 2008 || Kitt Peak || Spacewatch || — || align=right | 1.8 km || 
|-id=571 bgcolor=#fefefe
| 435571 ||  || — || August 21, 2008 || Kitt Peak || Spacewatch || — || align=right | 1.0 km || 
|-id=572 bgcolor=#fefefe
| 435572 ||  || — || August 21, 2008 || Kitt Peak || Spacewatch || — || align=right data-sort-value="0.92" | 920 m || 
|-id=573 bgcolor=#C2FFFF
| 435573 ||  || — || September 4, 2008 || Kitt Peak || Spacewatch || L4 || align=right | 6.5 km || 
|-id=574 bgcolor=#fefefe
| 435574 ||  || — || September 4, 2008 || Kitt Peak || Spacewatch || critical || align=right data-sort-value="0.86" | 860 m || 
|-id=575 bgcolor=#E9E9E9
| 435575 ||  || — || September 2, 2008 || Kitt Peak || Spacewatch || AEO || align=right | 1.1 km || 
|-id=576 bgcolor=#E9E9E9
| 435576 ||  || — || September 6, 2008 || Mount Lemmon || Mount Lemmon Survey || — || align=right | 2.0 km || 
|-id=577 bgcolor=#E9E9E9
| 435577 ||  || — || September 3, 2008 || Kitt Peak || Spacewatch || — || align=right | 1.5 km || 
|-id=578 bgcolor=#fefefe
| 435578 ||  || — || September 5, 2008 || Kitt Peak || Spacewatch || — || align=right data-sort-value="0.86" | 860 m || 
|-id=579 bgcolor=#E9E9E9
| 435579 ||  || — || September 5, 2008 || Kitt Peak || Spacewatch || — || align=right | 2.3 km || 
|-id=580 bgcolor=#d6d6d6
| 435580 ||  || — || September 6, 2008 || Mount Lemmon || Mount Lemmon Survey || BRA || align=right | 1.5 km || 
|-id=581 bgcolor=#fefefe
| 435581 ||  || — || September 3, 2008 || Kitt Peak || Spacewatch || MAScritical || align=right data-sort-value="0.54" | 540 m || 
|-id=582 bgcolor=#C2FFFF
| 435582 ||  || — || September 3, 2008 || Kitt Peak || Spacewatch || L4 || align=right | 8.9 km || 
|-id=583 bgcolor=#C2FFFF
| 435583 ||  || — || September 3, 2008 || Kitt Peak || Spacewatch || L4 || align=right | 7.9 km || 
|-id=584 bgcolor=#E9E9E9
| 435584 ||  || — || September 4, 2008 || Kitt Peak || Spacewatch || MAR || align=right | 1.1 km || 
|-id=585 bgcolor=#E9E9E9
| 435585 ||  || — || September 7, 2008 || Mount Lemmon || Mount Lemmon Survey || — || align=right | 2.2 km || 
|-id=586 bgcolor=#E9E9E9
| 435586 ||  || — || September 7, 2008 || Mount Lemmon || Mount Lemmon Survey || — || align=right | 1.4 km || 
|-id=587 bgcolor=#E9E9E9
| 435587 ||  || — || September 4, 2008 || Kitt Peak || Spacewatch || — || align=right data-sort-value="0.91" | 910 m || 
|-id=588 bgcolor=#fefefe
| 435588 ||  || — || September 7, 2008 || Catalina || CSS || NYS || align=right data-sort-value="0.64" | 640 m || 
|-id=589 bgcolor=#E9E9E9
| 435589 ||  || — || September 7, 2008 || Mount Lemmon || Mount Lemmon Survey || — || align=right | 1.9 km || 
|-id=590 bgcolor=#E9E9E9
| 435590 ||  || — || September 9, 2008 || Mount Lemmon || Mount Lemmon Survey || EUN || align=right | 1.2 km || 
|-id=591 bgcolor=#fefefe
| 435591 ||  || — || September 19, 2008 || Socorro || LINEAR || — || align=right data-sort-value="0.94" | 940 m || 
|-id=592 bgcolor=#E9E9E9
| 435592 ||  || — || September 5, 2008 || Kitt Peak || Spacewatch || — || align=right | 3.1 km || 
|-id=593 bgcolor=#d6d6d6
| 435593 ||  || — || September 4, 2003 || Kitt Peak || Spacewatch || — || align=right | 3.2 km || 
|-id=594 bgcolor=#E9E9E9
| 435594 ||  || — || September 22, 2008 || Socorro || LINEAR || — || align=right | 1.5 km || 
|-id=595 bgcolor=#fefefe
| 435595 ||  || — || September 6, 2008 || Kitt Peak || Spacewatch || — || align=right data-sort-value="0.96" | 960 m || 
|-id=596 bgcolor=#fefefe
| 435596 ||  || — || July 29, 2008 || Kitt Peak || Spacewatch || — || align=right data-sort-value="0.72" | 720 m || 
|-id=597 bgcolor=#E9E9E9
| 435597 ||  || — || September 19, 2008 || Kitt Peak || Spacewatch || — || align=right data-sort-value="0.87" | 870 m || 
|-id=598 bgcolor=#E9E9E9
| 435598 ||  || — || September 20, 2008 || Kitt Peak || Spacewatch || — || align=right data-sort-value="0.90" | 900 m || 
|-id=599 bgcolor=#E9E9E9
| 435599 ||  || — || September 20, 2008 || Kitt Peak || Spacewatch || — || align=right | 1.9 km || 
|-id=600 bgcolor=#E9E9E9
| 435600 ||  || — || September 20, 2008 || Kitt Peak || Spacewatch || — || align=right | 2.9 km || 
|}

435601–435700 

|-bgcolor=#E9E9E9
| 435601 ||  || — || September 20, 2008 || Kitt Peak || Spacewatch || — || align=right data-sort-value="0.78" | 780 m || 
|-id=602 bgcolor=#E9E9E9
| 435602 ||  || — || September 20, 2008 || Mount Lemmon || Mount Lemmon Survey || — || align=right | 1.3 km || 
|-id=603 bgcolor=#E9E9E9
| 435603 ||  || — || September 20, 2008 || Mount Lemmon || Mount Lemmon Survey || — || align=right | 2.0 km || 
|-id=604 bgcolor=#E9E9E9
| 435604 ||  || — || September 20, 2008 || Kitt Peak || Spacewatch || — || align=right | 2.0 km || 
|-id=605 bgcolor=#E9E9E9
| 435605 ||  || — || September 20, 2008 || Kitt Peak || Spacewatch || — || align=right | 1.8 km || 
|-id=606 bgcolor=#fefefe
| 435606 ||  || — || September 9, 2008 || Mount Lemmon || Mount Lemmon Survey || — || align=right data-sort-value="0.88" | 880 m || 
|-id=607 bgcolor=#E9E9E9
| 435607 ||  || — || September 7, 2008 || Mount Lemmon || Mount Lemmon Survey || — || align=right data-sort-value="0.74" | 740 m || 
|-id=608 bgcolor=#FA8072
| 435608 ||  || — || September 21, 2008 || Catalina || CSS || — || align=right data-sort-value="0.80" | 800 m || 
|-id=609 bgcolor=#fefefe
| 435609 ||  || — || September 22, 2008 || Kitt Peak || Spacewatch || NYS || align=right data-sort-value="0.63" | 630 m || 
|-id=610 bgcolor=#E9E9E9
| 435610 ||  || — || August 6, 2008 || Siding Spring || SSS || — || align=right | 1.7 km || 
|-id=611 bgcolor=#E9E9E9
| 435611 ||  || — || September 22, 2008 || Kitt Peak || Spacewatch || — || align=right | 1.1 km || 
|-id=612 bgcolor=#fefefe
| 435612 ||  || — || September 23, 2008 || Mount Lemmon || Mount Lemmon Survey || critical || align=right data-sort-value="0.75" | 750 m || 
|-id=613 bgcolor=#C2FFFF
| 435613 ||  || — || September 27, 2008 || Altschwendt || W. Ries || L4 || align=right | 8.7 km || 
|-id=614 bgcolor=#E9E9E9
| 435614 ||  || — || September 20, 2008 || Kitt Peak || Spacewatch || — || align=right | 1.6 km || 
|-id=615 bgcolor=#E9E9E9
| 435615 ||  || — || September 21, 2008 || Kitt Peak || Spacewatch || — || align=right | 1.6 km || 
|-id=616 bgcolor=#fefefe
| 435616 ||  || — || September 21, 2008 || Kitt Peak || Spacewatch || — || align=right data-sort-value="0.80" | 800 m || 
|-id=617 bgcolor=#E9E9E9
| 435617 ||  || — || September 21, 2008 || Kitt Peak || Spacewatch || (5) || align=right data-sort-value="0.72" | 720 m || 
|-id=618 bgcolor=#E9E9E9
| 435618 ||  || — || September 21, 2008 || Kitt Peak || Spacewatch || — || align=right data-sort-value="0.97" | 970 m || 
|-id=619 bgcolor=#E9E9E9
| 435619 ||  || — || September 21, 2008 || Kitt Peak || Spacewatch || EUN || align=right | 1.4 km || 
|-id=620 bgcolor=#C2FFFF
| 435620 ||  || — || September 22, 2008 || Kitt Peak || Spacewatch || L4 || align=right | 8.0 km || 
|-id=621 bgcolor=#E9E9E9
| 435621 ||  || — || September 22, 2008 || Kitt Peak || Spacewatch || — || align=right data-sort-value="0.92" | 920 m || 
|-id=622 bgcolor=#E9E9E9
| 435622 ||  || — || September 22, 2008 || Mount Lemmon || Mount Lemmon Survey || — || align=right | 1.1 km || 
|-id=623 bgcolor=#E9E9E9
| 435623 ||  || — || September 22, 2008 || Mount Lemmon || Mount Lemmon Survey || — || align=right data-sort-value="0.71" | 710 m || 
|-id=624 bgcolor=#E9E9E9
| 435624 ||  || — || September 22, 2008 || Mount Lemmon || Mount Lemmon Survey || — || align=right | 1.4 km || 
|-id=625 bgcolor=#E9E9E9
| 435625 ||  || — || September 22, 2008 || Mount Lemmon || Mount Lemmon Survey || MAR || align=right data-sort-value="0.99" | 990 m || 
|-id=626 bgcolor=#E9E9E9
| 435626 ||  || — || September 22, 2008 || Mount Lemmon || Mount Lemmon Survey || — || align=right | 2.3 km || 
|-id=627 bgcolor=#E9E9E9
| 435627 ||  || — || September 22, 2008 || Mount Lemmon || Mount Lemmon Survey || — || align=right | 2.5 km || 
|-id=628 bgcolor=#E9E9E9
| 435628 ||  || — || September 22, 2008 || Kitt Peak || Spacewatch || — || align=right | 2.5 km || 
|-id=629 bgcolor=#fefefe
| 435629 ||  || — || September 22, 2008 || Kitt Peak || Spacewatch || NYScritical || align=right data-sort-value="0.66" | 660 m || 
|-id=630 bgcolor=#fefefe
| 435630 ||  || — || September 22, 2008 || Kitt Peak || Spacewatch || H || align=right data-sort-value="0.63" | 630 m || 
|-id=631 bgcolor=#E9E9E9
| 435631 ||  || — || September 22, 2008 || Kitt Peak || Spacewatch || MAR || align=right data-sort-value="0.98" | 980 m || 
|-id=632 bgcolor=#C2FFFF
| 435632 ||  || — || September 23, 2008 || Mount Lemmon || Mount Lemmon Survey || L4 || align=right | 8.0 km || 
|-id=633 bgcolor=#E9E9E9
| 435633 ||  || — || September 24, 2008 || Mount Lemmon || Mount Lemmon Survey || — || align=right | 1.7 km || 
|-id=634 bgcolor=#E9E9E9
| 435634 ||  || — || September 24, 2008 || Mount Lemmon || Mount Lemmon Survey || — || align=right | 2.2 km || 
|-id=635 bgcolor=#fefefe
| 435635 ||  || — || September 23, 2008 || Socorro || LINEAR || — || align=right | 1.7 km || 
|-id=636 bgcolor=#fefefe
| 435636 ||  || — || September 24, 2008 || Socorro || LINEAR || — || align=right data-sort-value="0.98" | 980 m || 
|-id=637 bgcolor=#E9E9E9
| 435637 ||  || — || September 28, 2008 || Socorro || LINEAR || — || align=right | 2.2 km || 
|-id=638 bgcolor=#FA8072
| 435638 ||  || — || March 14, 2007 || Catalina || CSS || H || align=right data-sort-value="0.75" | 750 m || 
|-id=639 bgcolor=#E9E9E9
| 435639 ||  || — || September 25, 2008 || Kitt Peak || Spacewatch || — || align=right | 1.3 km || 
|-id=640 bgcolor=#E9E9E9
| 435640 ||  || — || September 25, 2008 || Kitt Peak || Spacewatch || (5) || align=right data-sort-value="0.63" | 630 m || 
|-id=641 bgcolor=#E9E9E9
| 435641 ||  || — || September 25, 2008 || Kitt Peak || Spacewatch || — || align=right | 1.5 km || 
|-id=642 bgcolor=#E9E9E9
| 435642 ||  || — || September 26, 2008 || Kitt Peak || Spacewatch || — || align=right | 1.3 km || 
|-id=643 bgcolor=#E9E9E9
| 435643 ||  || — || September 2, 2008 || Kitt Peak || Spacewatch || — || align=right | 1.9 km || 
|-id=644 bgcolor=#E9E9E9
| 435644 ||  || — || September 5, 2008 || Kitt Peak || Spacewatch || EUN || align=right | 1.2 km || 
|-id=645 bgcolor=#C2FFFF
| 435645 ||  || — || September 26, 2008 || Kitt Peak || Spacewatch || L4 || align=right | 7.1 km || 
|-id=646 bgcolor=#E9E9E9
| 435646 ||  || — || September 26, 2008 || Kitt Peak || Spacewatch || — || align=right | 1.2 km || 
|-id=647 bgcolor=#C2FFFF
| 435647 ||  || — || September 28, 2008 || Mount Lemmon || Mount Lemmon Survey || L4 || align=right | 7.2 km || 
|-id=648 bgcolor=#E9E9E9
| 435648 ||  || — || September 29, 2008 || Mount Lemmon || Mount Lemmon Survey || — || align=right | 2.4 km || 
|-id=649 bgcolor=#E9E9E9
| 435649 ||  || — || September 21, 2008 || Kitt Peak || Spacewatch || — || align=right | 1.9 km || 
|-id=650 bgcolor=#E9E9E9
| 435650 ||  || — || September 2, 2008 || Kitt Peak || Spacewatch || — || align=right | 1.3 km || 
|-id=651 bgcolor=#E9E9E9
| 435651 ||  || — || September 22, 2008 || Catalina || CSS || — || align=right | 2.0 km || 
|-id=652 bgcolor=#C2FFFF
| 435652 ||  || — || September 24, 2008 || Kitt Peak || Spacewatch || L4 || align=right | 7.6 km || 
|-id=653 bgcolor=#E9E9E9
| 435653 ||  || — || September 29, 2008 || Kitt Peak || Spacewatch || — || align=right | 1.7 km || 
|-id=654 bgcolor=#E9E9E9
| 435654 ||  || — || September 22, 2008 || Kitt Peak || Spacewatch || — || align=right | 1.7 km || 
|-id=655 bgcolor=#E9E9E9
| 435655 ||  || — || September 23, 2008 || Kitt Peak || Spacewatch || MAR || align=right | 1.3 km || 
|-id=656 bgcolor=#E9E9E9
| 435656 ||  || — || September 23, 2008 || Catalina || CSS || — || align=right | 1.3 km || 
|-id=657 bgcolor=#E9E9E9
| 435657 ||  || — || September 23, 2008 || Mount Lemmon || Mount Lemmon Survey || — || align=right | 2.4 km || 
|-id=658 bgcolor=#C2FFFF
| 435658 ||  || — || September 19, 2008 || Kitt Peak || Spacewatch || L4 || align=right | 7.3 km || 
|-id=659 bgcolor=#C2FFFF
| 435659 ||  || — || September 20, 2008 || Mount Lemmon || Mount Lemmon Survey || L4 || align=right | 6.6 km || 
|-id=660 bgcolor=#C2FFFF
| 435660 ||  || — || September 25, 2008 || Kitt Peak || Spacewatch || L4 || align=right | 8.0 km || 
|-id=661 bgcolor=#d6d6d6
| 435661 ||  || — || September 24, 2008 || Kitt Peak || Spacewatch || — || align=right | 2.0 km || 
|-id=662 bgcolor=#E9E9E9
| 435662 ||  || — || September 22, 2008 || Kitt Peak || Spacewatch || WIT || align=right data-sort-value="0.84" | 840 m || 
|-id=663 bgcolor=#E9E9E9
| 435663 ||  || — || September 23, 2008 || Kitt Peak || Spacewatch || — || align=right | 2.2 km || 
|-id=664 bgcolor=#E9E9E9
| 435664 ||  || — || September 24, 2008 || Mount Lemmon || Mount Lemmon Survey || EUN || align=right | 1.1 km || 
|-id=665 bgcolor=#E9E9E9
| 435665 ||  || — || September 29, 2008 || Kitt Peak || Spacewatch || WIT || align=right data-sort-value="0.86" | 860 m || 
|-id=666 bgcolor=#fefefe
| 435666 ||  || — || September 20, 2008 || Mount Lemmon || Mount Lemmon Survey || H || align=right data-sort-value="0.63" | 630 m || 
|-id=667 bgcolor=#E9E9E9
| 435667 ||  || — || September 24, 2008 || Catalina || CSS || — || align=right | 2.0 km || 
|-id=668 bgcolor=#E9E9E9
| 435668 ||  || — || September 24, 2008 || Mount Lemmon || Mount Lemmon Survey || — || align=right | 1.4 km || 
|-id=669 bgcolor=#E9E9E9
| 435669 ||  || — || September 28, 2008 || Mount Lemmon || Mount Lemmon Survey || — || align=right | 2.4 km || 
|-id=670 bgcolor=#fefefe
| 435670 ||  || — || September 23, 2008 || Catalina || CSS || H || align=right data-sort-value="0.66" | 660 m || 
|-id=671 bgcolor=#fefefe
| 435671 ||  || — || October 4, 2008 || La Sagra || OAM Obs. || H || align=right data-sort-value="0.96" | 960 m || 
|-id=672 bgcolor=#E9E9E9
| 435672 ||  || — || October 5, 2008 || Hibiscus || N. Teamo || — || align=right data-sort-value="0.79" | 790 m || 
|-id=673 bgcolor=#E9E9E9
| 435673 ||  || — || September 9, 2008 || Mount Lemmon || Mount Lemmon Survey || KON || align=right | 2.4 km || 
|-id=674 bgcolor=#E9E9E9
| 435674 ||  || — || September 19, 2008 || Kitt Peak || Spacewatch || EUN || align=right | 1.4 km || 
|-id=675 bgcolor=#E9E9E9
| 435675 ||  || — || October 1, 2008 || Kitt Peak || Spacewatch || — || align=right | 1.2 km || 
|-id=676 bgcolor=#E9E9E9
| 435676 ||  || — || October 1, 2008 || Mount Lemmon || Mount Lemmon Survey || — || align=right | 1.4 km || 
|-id=677 bgcolor=#E9E9E9
| 435677 ||  || — || October 1, 2008 || Kitt Peak || Spacewatch || — || align=right | 1.7 km || 
|-id=678 bgcolor=#E9E9E9
| 435678 ||  || — || October 1, 2008 || Kitt Peak || Spacewatch || — || align=right data-sort-value="0.88" | 880 m || 
|-id=679 bgcolor=#E9E9E9
| 435679 ||  || — || September 24, 2008 || Kitt Peak || Spacewatch || EUN || align=right | 1.1 km || 
|-id=680 bgcolor=#E9E9E9
| 435680 ||  || — || September 22, 2008 || Mount Lemmon || Mount Lemmon Survey || MAR || align=right data-sort-value="0.85" | 850 m || 
|-id=681 bgcolor=#E9E9E9
| 435681 ||  || — || September 22, 2008 || Mount Lemmon || Mount Lemmon Survey || — || align=right | 1.4 km || 
|-id=682 bgcolor=#E9E9E9
| 435682 ||  || — || March 25, 2006 || Mount Lemmon || Mount Lemmon Survey || — || align=right | 1.6 km || 
|-id=683 bgcolor=#E9E9E9
| 435683 ||  || — || October 2, 2008 || Kitt Peak || Spacewatch || — || align=right | 1.0 km || 
|-id=684 bgcolor=#E9E9E9
| 435684 ||  || — || September 22, 2008 || Mount Lemmon || Mount Lemmon Survey || — || align=right | 2.1 km || 
|-id=685 bgcolor=#fefefe
| 435685 ||  || — || July 2, 2000 || Kitt Peak || Spacewatch || MAScritical || align=right data-sort-value="0.68" | 680 m || 
|-id=686 bgcolor=#fefefe
| 435686 ||  || — || October 3, 2008 || Kitt Peak || Spacewatch || H || align=right data-sort-value="0.87" | 870 m || 
|-id=687 bgcolor=#fefefe
| 435687 ||  || — || September 22, 2008 || Catalina || CSS || — || align=right | 1.2 km || 
|-id=688 bgcolor=#E9E9E9
| 435688 ||  || — || October 6, 2008 || Kitt Peak || Spacewatch || — || align=right | 2.3 km || 
|-id=689 bgcolor=#E9E9E9
| 435689 ||  || — || October 6, 2008 || Kitt Peak || Spacewatch || EUN || align=right | 1.3 km || 
|-id=690 bgcolor=#fefefe
| 435690 ||  || — || October 6, 2008 || Kitt Peak || Spacewatch || H || align=right data-sort-value="0.52" | 520 m || 
|-id=691 bgcolor=#E9E9E9
| 435691 ||  || — || October 6, 2008 || Catalina || CSS || EUN || align=right | 1.2 km || 
|-id=692 bgcolor=#E9E9E9
| 435692 ||  || — || September 23, 2008 || Kitt Peak || Spacewatch || — || align=right | 1.5 km || 
|-id=693 bgcolor=#E9E9E9
| 435693 ||  || — || September 7, 2008 || Mount Lemmon || Mount Lemmon Survey || — || align=right | 1.1 km || 
|-id=694 bgcolor=#E9E9E9
| 435694 ||  || — || November 10, 2004 || Kitt Peak || Spacewatch || — || align=right | 1.4 km || 
|-id=695 bgcolor=#E9E9E9
| 435695 ||  || — || October 8, 2008 || Mount Lemmon || Mount Lemmon Survey || — || align=right | 2.4 km || 
|-id=696 bgcolor=#E9E9E9
| 435696 ||  || — || October 8, 2008 || Kitt Peak || Spacewatch || — || align=right data-sort-value="0.90" | 900 m || 
|-id=697 bgcolor=#E9E9E9
| 435697 ||  || — || October 8, 2008 || Mount Lemmon || Mount Lemmon Survey || (5) || align=right data-sort-value="0.90" | 900 m || 
|-id=698 bgcolor=#E9E9E9
| 435698 ||  || — || February 24, 2006 || Kitt Peak || Spacewatch || GEF || align=right | 1.2 km || 
|-id=699 bgcolor=#E9E9E9
| 435699 ||  || — || October 9, 2008 || Mount Lemmon || Mount Lemmon Survey || — || align=right data-sort-value="0.81" | 810 m || 
|-id=700 bgcolor=#E9E9E9
| 435700 ||  || — || October 9, 2008 || Mount Lemmon || Mount Lemmon Survey || — || align=right | 1.5 km || 
|}

435701–435800 

|-bgcolor=#E9E9E9
| 435701 ||  || — || October 9, 2008 || Mount Lemmon || Mount Lemmon Survey || — || align=right | 2.6 km || 
|-id=702 bgcolor=#E9E9E9
| 435702 ||  || — || October 9, 2008 || Mount Lemmon || Mount Lemmon Survey || — || align=right | 1.6 km || 
|-id=703 bgcolor=#E9E9E9
| 435703 ||  || — || September 28, 2008 || Mount Lemmon || Mount Lemmon Survey || — || align=right | 1.7 km || 
|-id=704 bgcolor=#fefefe
| 435704 ||  || — || October 4, 2008 || Catalina || CSS || — || align=right data-sort-value="0.74" | 740 m || 
|-id=705 bgcolor=#fefefe
| 435705 ||  || — || October 9, 2008 || Mount Lemmon || Mount Lemmon Survey || — || align=right data-sort-value="0.78" | 780 m || 
|-id=706 bgcolor=#E9E9E9
| 435706 ||  || — || October 4, 2008 || Mount Lemmon || Mount Lemmon Survey || WIT || align=right data-sort-value="0.94" | 940 m || 
|-id=707 bgcolor=#E9E9E9
| 435707 ||  || — || October 2, 2008 || Kitt Peak || Spacewatch || — || align=right | 1.1 km || 
|-id=708 bgcolor=#E9E9E9
| 435708 ||  || — || October 10, 2008 || Kitt Peak || Spacewatch || — || align=right | 1.1 km || 
|-id=709 bgcolor=#fefefe
| 435709 ||  || — || October 19, 2008 || Farra d'Isonzo || Farra d'Isonzo || — || align=right | 1.1 km || 
|-id=710 bgcolor=#E9E9E9
| 435710 ||  || — || August 24, 2008 || Kitt Peak || Spacewatch || — || align=right | 1.9 km || 
|-id=711 bgcolor=#E9E9E9
| 435711 ||  || — || May 2, 2006 || Mount Lemmon || Mount Lemmon Survey || AEO || align=right | 1.1 km || 
|-id=712 bgcolor=#E9E9E9
| 435712 ||  || — || October 19, 2008 || Kitt Peak || Spacewatch || — || align=right | 2.5 km || 
|-id=713 bgcolor=#E9E9E9
| 435713 ||  || — || March 24, 2006 || Anderson Mesa || LONEOS || — || align=right | 2.4 km || 
|-id=714 bgcolor=#E9E9E9
| 435714 ||  || — || October 20, 2008 || Kitt Peak || Spacewatch || — || align=right | 1.4 km || 
|-id=715 bgcolor=#E9E9E9
| 435715 ||  || — || October 20, 2008 || Kitt Peak || Spacewatch || — || align=right | 2.5 km || 
|-id=716 bgcolor=#E9E9E9
| 435716 ||  || — || October 20, 2008 || Kitt Peak || Spacewatch || — || align=right data-sort-value="0.86" | 860 m || 
|-id=717 bgcolor=#E9E9E9
| 435717 ||  || — || October 20, 2008 || Mount Lemmon || Mount Lemmon Survey || — || align=right | 1.9 km || 
|-id=718 bgcolor=#E9E9E9
| 435718 ||  || — || October 20, 2008 || Kitt Peak || Spacewatch || — || align=right | 1.6 km || 
|-id=719 bgcolor=#E9E9E9
| 435719 ||  || — || October 20, 2008 || Kitt Peak || Spacewatch || — || align=right | 1.4 km || 
|-id=720 bgcolor=#E9E9E9
| 435720 ||  || — || October 20, 2008 || Kitt Peak || Spacewatch || EUN || align=right | 1.5 km || 
|-id=721 bgcolor=#E9E9E9
| 435721 ||  || — || September 24, 2008 || Mount Lemmon || Mount Lemmon Survey || — || align=right data-sort-value="0.88" | 880 m || 
|-id=722 bgcolor=#E9E9E9
| 435722 ||  || — || September 22, 2008 || Mount Lemmon || Mount Lemmon Survey || — || align=right | 2.0 km || 
|-id=723 bgcolor=#E9E9E9
| 435723 ||  || — || October 21, 2008 || Kitt Peak || Spacewatch || — || align=right | 2.0 km || 
|-id=724 bgcolor=#E9E9E9
| 435724 ||  || — || October 21, 2008 || Kitt Peak || Spacewatch || — || align=right | 1.8 km || 
|-id=725 bgcolor=#E9E9E9
| 435725 ||  || — || September 29, 2008 || Mount Lemmon || Mount Lemmon Survey || — || align=right | 2.0 km || 
|-id=726 bgcolor=#E9E9E9
| 435726 ||  || — || September 24, 2008 || Mount Lemmon || Mount Lemmon Survey || — || align=right | 1.0 km || 
|-id=727 bgcolor=#E9E9E9
| 435727 ||  || — || September 2, 2008 || Kitt Peak || Spacewatch || — || align=right | 2.5 km || 
|-id=728 bgcolor=#E9E9E9
| 435728 Yunlin ||  ||  || October 22, 2008 || Lulin Observatory || X. Y. Hsiao, Q.-z. Ye || — || align=right | 1.7 km || 
|-id=729 bgcolor=#fefefe
| 435729 ||  || — || October 23, 2008 || Kitt Peak || Spacewatch || H || align=right data-sort-value="0.55" | 550 m || 
|-id=730 bgcolor=#FFC2E0
| 435730 ||  || — || October 27, 2008 || Mount Lemmon || Mount Lemmon Survey || AMOcritical || align=right data-sort-value="0.59" | 590 m || 
|-id=731 bgcolor=#E9E9E9
| 435731 ||  || — || October 1, 2008 || Kitt Peak || Spacewatch || (5) || align=right data-sort-value="0.78" | 780 m || 
|-id=732 bgcolor=#E9E9E9
| 435732 ||  || — || October 21, 2008 || Kitt Peak || Spacewatch || — || align=right | 2.4 km || 
|-id=733 bgcolor=#C2FFFF
| 435733 ||  || — || September 5, 2008 || Kitt Peak || Spacewatch || L4 || align=right | 8.2 km || 
|-id=734 bgcolor=#E9E9E9
| 435734 ||  || — || September 30, 2008 || Mount Lemmon || Mount Lemmon Survey || — || align=right | 1.5 km || 
|-id=735 bgcolor=#E9E9E9
| 435735 ||  || — || October 22, 2008 || Kitt Peak || Spacewatch || — || align=right | 1.6 km || 
|-id=736 bgcolor=#E9E9E9
| 435736 ||  || — || October 22, 2008 || Kitt Peak || Spacewatch || — || align=right | 2.8 km || 
|-id=737 bgcolor=#fefefe
| 435737 ||  || — || November 3, 2004 || Kitt Peak || Spacewatch || — || align=right data-sort-value="0.83" | 830 m || 
|-id=738 bgcolor=#E9E9E9
| 435738 ||  || — || October 2, 2008 || Kitt Peak || Spacewatch || — || align=right | 2.0 km || 
|-id=739 bgcolor=#E9E9E9
| 435739 ||  || — || October 9, 2008 || Kitt Peak || Spacewatch || — || align=right | 1.4 km || 
|-id=740 bgcolor=#E9E9E9
| 435740 ||  || — || October 23, 2008 || Kitt Peak || Spacewatch || — || align=right | 1.3 km || 
|-id=741 bgcolor=#E9E9E9
| 435741 ||  || — || October 1, 2008 || Mount Lemmon || Mount Lemmon Survey || — || align=right | 1.2 km || 
|-id=742 bgcolor=#E9E9E9
| 435742 ||  || — || October 23, 2008 || Kitt Peak || Spacewatch || — || align=right | 2.0 km || 
|-id=743 bgcolor=#E9E9E9
| 435743 ||  || — || October 23, 2008 || Kitt Peak || Spacewatch || — || align=right data-sort-value="0.68" | 680 m || 
|-id=744 bgcolor=#E9E9E9
| 435744 ||  || — || September 6, 2008 || Catalina || CSS || (5) || align=right | 1.2 km || 
|-id=745 bgcolor=#E9E9E9
| 435745 ||  || — || September 22, 2008 || Mount Lemmon || Mount Lemmon Survey || — || align=right | 2.3 km || 
|-id=746 bgcolor=#E9E9E9
| 435746 ||  || — || October 23, 2008 || Kitt Peak || Spacewatch || — || align=right | 2.2 km || 
|-id=747 bgcolor=#E9E9E9
| 435747 ||  || — || September 22, 2008 || Mount Lemmon || Mount Lemmon Survey || — || align=right | 1.6 km || 
|-id=748 bgcolor=#E9E9E9
| 435748 ||  || — || October 23, 2008 || Mount Lemmon || Mount Lemmon Survey || MAR || align=right | 1.1 km || 
|-id=749 bgcolor=#E9E9E9
| 435749 ||  || — || October 23, 2008 || Kitt Peak || Spacewatch || — || align=right data-sort-value="0.81" | 810 m || 
|-id=750 bgcolor=#E9E9E9
| 435750 ||  || — || October 23, 2008 || Kitt Peak || Spacewatch || MAR || align=right | 1.2 km || 
|-id=751 bgcolor=#E9E9E9
| 435751 ||  || — || October 23, 2008 || Kitt Peak || Spacewatch || — || align=right | 2.2 km || 
|-id=752 bgcolor=#E9E9E9
| 435752 ||  || — || October 24, 2008 || Kitt Peak || Spacewatch || — || align=right | 1.7 km || 
|-id=753 bgcolor=#E9E9E9
| 435753 ||  || — || October 24, 2008 || Catalina || CSS || EUN || align=right | 1.4 km || 
|-id=754 bgcolor=#E9E9E9
| 435754 ||  || — || October 24, 2008 || Kitt Peak || Spacewatch || — || align=right | 1.9 km || 
|-id=755 bgcolor=#E9E9E9
| 435755 ||  || — || October 24, 2008 || Kitt Peak || Spacewatch || — || align=right | 1.1 km || 
|-id=756 bgcolor=#E9E9E9
| 435756 ||  || — || October 25, 2008 || Catalina || CSS || — || align=right | 1.6 km || 
|-id=757 bgcolor=#E9E9E9
| 435757 ||  || — || September 29, 2008 || Mount Lemmon || Mount Lemmon Survey || (5) || align=right | 3.0 km || 
|-id=758 bgcolor=#E9E9E9
| 435758 ||  || — || September 23, 2008 || Catalina || CSS || — || align=right | 2.2 km || 
|-id=759 bgcolor=#E9E9E9
| 435759 ||  || — || September 23, 2008 || Catalina || CSS || — || align=right | 2.4 km || 
|-id=760 bgcolor=#E9E9E9
| 435760 ||  || — || October 9, 2008 || Kitt Peak || Spacewatch || — || align=right | 1.6 km || 
|-id=761 bgcolor=#E9E9E9
| 435761 ||  || — || September 22, 2008 || Mount Lemmon || Mount Lemmon Survey || — || align=right | 1.3 km || 
|-id=762 bgcolor=#E9E9E9
| 435762 ||  || — || October 23, 2008 || Kitt Peak || Spacewatch || — || align=right | 1.2 km || 
|-id=763 bgcolor=#E9E9E9
| 435763 ||  || — || October 24, 2008 || Catalina || CSS || — || align=right | 1.6 km || 
|-id=764 bgcolor=#E9E9E9
| 435764 ||  || — || October 26, 2008 || Kitt Peak || Spacewatch || — || align=right | 2.3 km || 
|-id=765 bgcolor=#E9E9E9
| 435765 ||  || — || October 8, 2008 || Catalina || CSS || — || align=right | 2.5 km || 
|-id=766 bgcolor=#E9E9E9
| 435766 ||  || — || October 27, 2008 || Kitt Peak || Spacewatch || RAF || align=right | 1.2 km || 
|-id=767 bgcolor=#E9E9E9
| 435767 ||  || — || October 9, 2008 || Mount Lemmon || Mount Lemmon Survey || — || align=right | 1.2 km || 
|-id=768 bgcolor=#fefefe
| 435768 ||  || — || October 27, 2008 || Kitt Peak || Spacewatch || H || align=right data-sort-value="0.68" | 680 m || 
|-id=769 bgcolor=#E9E9E9
| 435769 ||  || — || September 25, 2008 || Kitt Peak || Spacewatch || — || align=right | 1.7 km || 
|-id=770 bgcolor=#E9E9E9
| 435770 ||  || — || March 24, 2006 || Kitt Peak || Spacewatch || NEM || align=right | 2.1 km || 
|-id=771 bgcolor=#d6d6d6
| 435771 ||  || — || October 28, 2008 || Kitt Peak || Spacewatch || 615 || align=right | 1.4 km || 
|-id=772 bgcolor=#E9E9E9
| 435772 ||  || — || September 6, 2008 || Mount Lemmon || Mount Lemmon Survey || — || align=right | 1.3 km || 
|-id=773 bgcolor=#E9E9E9
| 435773 ||  || — || October 7, 2008 || Kitt Peak || Spacewatch || — || align=right | 1.2 km || 
|-id=774 bgcolor=#E9E9E9
| 435774 ||  || — || October 28, 2008 || Mount Lemmon || Mount Lemmon Survey || — || align=right data-sort-value="0.86" | 860 m || 
|-id=775 bgcolor=#E9E9E9
| 435775 ||  || — || September 23, 2008 || Mount Lemmon || Mount Lemmon Survey || — || align=right | 1.4 km || 
|-id=776 bgcolor=#E9E9E9
| 435776 ||  || — || October 2, 2008 || Mount Lemmon || Mount Lemmon Survey || — || align=right | 1.2 km || 
|-id=777 bgcolor=#E9E9E9
| 435777 ||  || — || October 29, 2008 || Kitt Peak || Spacewatch || — || align=right | 1.4 km || 
|-id=778 bgcolor=#C2FFFF
| 435778 ||  || — || September 29, 2008 || Mount Lemmon || Mount Lemmon Survey || L4 || align=right | 8.6 km || 
|-id=779 bgcolor=#E9E9E9
| 435779 ||  || — || October 22, 2008 || Kitt Peak || Spacewatch || — || align=right | 2.4 km || 
|-id=780 bgcolor=#E9E9E9
| 435780 ||  || — || October 30, 2008 || Catalina || CSS || EUN || align=right | 1.8 km || 
|-id=781 bgcolor=#E9E9E9
| 435781 ||  || — || October 6, 2008 || Socorro || LINEAR || MAR || align=right | 1.4 km || 
|-id=782 bgcolor=#E9E9E9
| 435782 ||  || — || September 29, 2008 || Mount Lemmon || Mount Lemmon Survey || — || align=right | 1.1 km || 
|-id=783 bgcolor=#E9E9E9
| 435783 ||  || — || October 30, 2008 || Mount Lemmon || Mount Lemmon Survey || WIT || align=right data-sort-value="0.91" | 910 m || 
|-id=784 bgcolor=#E9E9E9
| 435784 ||  || — || September 24, 2008 || Kitt Peak || Spacewatch || — || align=right | 1.8 km || 
|-id=785 bgcolor=#E9E9E9
| 435785 ||  || — || October 20, 2008 || Kitt Peak || Spacewatch || — || align=right | 1.9 km || 
|-id=786 bgcolor=#E9E9E9
| 435786 ||  || — || October 23, 2008 || Kitt Peak || Spacewatch || — || align=right | 1.3 km || 
|-id=787 bgcolor=#E9E9E9
| 435787 ||  || — || October 30, 2008 || Catalina || CSS || EUN || align=right | 1.3 km || 
|-id=788 bgcolor=#E9E9E9
| 435788 ||  || — || October 26, 2008 || Mount Lemmon || Mount Lemmon Survey || — || align=right | 3.0 km || 
|-id=789 bgcolor=#E9E9E9
| 435789 ||  || — || September 29, 2008 || Kitt Peak || Spacewatch || — || align=right | 1.4 km || 
|-id=790 bgcolor=#E9E9E9
| 435790 ||  || — || October 28, 2008 || Kitt Peak || Spacewatch || — || align=right | 1.9 km || 
|-id=791 bgcolor=#d6d6d6
| 435791 ||  || — || October 24, 2008 || Kitt Peak || Spacewatch || BRA || align=right | 1.4 km || 
|-id=792 bgcolor=#E9E9E9
| 435792 ||  || — || October 26, 2008 || Mount Lemmon || Mount Lemmon Survey || — || align=right | 1.8 km || 
|-id=793 bgcolor=#E9E9E9
| 435793 ||  || — || October 27, 2008 || Kitt Peak || Spacewatch || — || align=right | 1.3 km || 
|-id=794 bgcolor=#E9E9E9
| 435794 ||  || — || October 29, 2008 || Kitt Peak || Spacewatch || — || align=right | 1.1 km || 
|-id=795 bgcolor=#E9E9E9
| 435795 ||  || — || October 9, 2008 || Catalina || CSS || EUN || align=right | 1.3 km || 
|-id=796 bgcolor=#E9E9E9
| 435796 ||  || — || October 29, 2008 || Kitt Peak || Spacewatch || — || align=right | 1.9 km || 
|-id=797 bgcolor=#E9E9E9
| 435797 ||  || — || November 4, 2008 || Tzec Maun || E. Schwab || — || align=right data-sort-value="0.97" | 970 m || 
|-id=798 bgcolor=#E9E9E9
| 435798 ||  || — || November 1, 2008 || Kitt Peak || Spacewatch || — || align=right | 1.3 km || 
|-id=799 bgcolor=#E9E9E9
| 435799 ||  || — || October 10, 2008 || Mount Lemmon || Mount Lemmon Survey || — || align=right | 2.2 km || 
|-id=800 bgcolor=#E9E9E9
| 435800 ||  || — || September 29, 2008 || Kitt Peak || Spacewatch || — || align=right | 1.2 km || 
|}

435801–435900 

|-bgcolor=#E9E9E9
| 435801 ||  || — || November 1, 2008 || Mount Lemmon || Mount Lemmon Survey || — || align=right | 1.4 km || 
|-id=802 bgcolor=#E9E9E9
| 435802 ||  || — || November 3, 2008 || Kitt Peak || Spacewatch || — || align=right | 1.0 km || 
|-id=803 bgcolor=#E9E9E9
| 435803 ||  || — || November 4, 2008 || Catalina || CSS || MAR || align=right | 1.3 km || 
|-id=804 bgcolor=#E9E9E9
| 435804 ||  || — || September 23, 2008 || Kitt Peak || Spacewatch || — || align=right | 1.6 km || 
|-id=805 bgcolor=#fefefe
| 435805 ||  || — || November 6, 2008 || Mount Lemmon || Mount Lemmon Survey || H || align=right data-sort-value="0.90" | 900 m || 
|-id=806 bgcolor=#E9E9E9
| 435806 ||  || — || October 22, 2008 || Kitt Peak || Spacewatch || — || align=right | 2.7 km || 
|-id=807 bgcolor=#E9E9E9
| 435807 ||  || — || November 8, 2008 || Kitt Peak || Spacewatch || (5) || align=right data-sort-value="0.84" | 840 m || 
|-id=808 bgcolor=#E9E9E9
| 435808 ||  || — || October 1, 2008 || Mount Lemmon || Mount Lemmon Survey || — || align=right | 1.7 km || 
|-id=809 bgcolor=#E9E9E9
| 435809 ||  || — || November 8, 2008 || Kitt Peak || Spacewatch || — || align=right | 1.9 km || 
|-id=810 bgcolor=#E9E9E9
| 435810 ||  || — || November 7, 2008 || Mount Lemmon || Mount Lemmon Survey || — || align=right | 1.6 km || 
|-id=811 bgcolor=#fefefe
| 435811 ||  || — || November 18, 2008 || Socorro || LINEAR || H || align=right data-sort-value="0.88" | 880 m || 
|-id=812 bgcolor=#E9E9E9
| 435812 ||  || — || November 18, 2008 || Socorro || LINEAR || — || align=right | 1.9 km || 
|-id=813 bgcolor=#E9E9E9
| 435813 ||  || — || September 6, 2008 || Mount Lemmon || Mount Lemmon Survey || — || align=right | 1.6 km || 
|-id=814 bgcolor=#E9E9E9
| 435814 ||  || — || November 17, 2008 || Kitt Peak || Spacewatch ||  || align=right | 1.7 km || 
|-id=815 bgcolor=#E9E9E9
| 435815 ||  || — || September 22, 2008 || Mount Lemmon || Mount Lemmon Survey || — || align=right | 1.0 km || 
|-id=816 bgcolor=#E9E9E9
| 435816 ||  || — || November 20, 2004 || Kitt Peak || Spacewatch || — || align=right | 1.1 km || 
|-id=817 bgcolor=#E9E9E9
| 435817 ||  || — || November 19, 2008 || Mount Lemmon || Mount Lemmon Survey || — || align=right | 2.0 km || 
|-id=818 bgcolor=#FA8072
| 435818 ||  || — || November 21, 2008 || Socorro || LINEAR || H || align=right data-sort-value="0.61" | 610 m || 
|-id=819 bgcolor=#E9E9E9
| 435819 ||  || — || November 17, 2008 || Kitt Peak || Spacewatch || JUN || align=right | 1.2 km || 
|-id=820 bgcolor=#E9E9E9
| 435820 ||  || — || November 17, 2008 || Kitt Peak || Spacewatch || DOR || align=right | 2.6 km || 
|-id=821 bgcolor=#E9E9E9
| 435821 ||  || — || November 17, 2008 || Kitt Peak || Spacewatch || — || align=right | 2.0 km || 
|-id=822 bgcolor=#E9E9E9
| 435822 ||  || — || September 27, 2008 || Mount Lemmon || Mount Lemmon Survey || — || align=right | 1.3 km || 
|-id=823 bgcolor=#E9E9E9
| 435823 ||  || — || November 23, 2008 || Socorro || LINEAR || — || align=right | 2.4 km || 
|-id=824 bgcolor=#E9E9E9
| 435824 ||  || — || October 23, 2008 || Mount Lemmon || Mount Lemmon Survey || — || align=right | 2.7 km || 
|-id=825 bgcolor=#E9E9E9
| 435825 ||  || — || November 17, 2008 || Kitt Peak || Spacewatch || — || align=right | 2.0 km || 
|-id=826 bgcolor=#E9E9E9
| 435826 ||  || — || October 21, 2008 || Kitt Peak || Spacewatch || — || align=right | 1.3 km || 
|-id=827 bgcolor=#E9E9E9
| 435827 ||  || — || October 3, 2008 || Mount Lemmon || Mount Lemmon Survey || — || align=right | 2.1 km || 
|-id=828 bgcolor=#d6d6d6
| 435828 ||  || — || November 6, 2008 || Mount Lemmon || Mount Lemmon Survey || THM || align=right | 2.0 km || 
|-id=829 bgcolor=#d6d6d6
| 435829 ||  || — || November 18, 2008 || Kitt Peak || Spacewatch || — || align=right | 2.1 km || 
|-id=830 bgcolor=#E9E9E9
| 435830 ||  || — || October 9, 2008 || Kitt Peak || Spacewatch || — || align=right | 2.6 km || 
|-id=831 bgcolor=#E9E9E9
| 435831 ||  || — || November 20, 2008 || Kitt Peak || Spacewatch || — || align=right | 2.7 km || 
|-id=832 bgcolor=#E9E9E9
| 435832 ||  || — || September 9, 2008 || Mount Lemmon || Mount Lemmon Survey || (5) || align=right data-sort-value="0.70" | 700 m || 
|-id=833 bgcolor=#E9E9E9
| 435833 ||  || — || October 25, 2008 || Mount Lemmon || Mount Lemmon Survey || MAR || align=right | 1.1 km || 
|-id=834 bgcolor=#E9E9E9
| 435834 ||  || — || November 20, 2008 || Kitt Peak || Spacewatch || — || align=right | 2.0 km || 
|-id=835 bgcolor=#E9E9E9
| 435835 ||  || — || November 1, 2008 || Kitt Peak || Spacewatch || RAF || align=right | 1.4 km || 
|-id=836 bgcolor=#d6d6d6
| 435836 ||  || — || November 7, 2008 || Mount Lemmon || Mount Lemmon Survey || EOS || align=right | 2.3 km || 
|-id=837 bgcolor=#E9E9E9
| 435837 ||  || — || November 21, 2008 || Mount Lemmon || Mount Lemmon Survey || — || align=right | 1.5 km || 
|-id=838 bgcolor=#E9E9E9
| 435838 ||  || — || October 6, 2008 || Mount Lemmon || Mount Lemmon Survey || — || align=right | 1.4 km || 
|-id=839 bgcolor=#E9E9E9
| 435839 ||  || — || November 21, 2008 || Mount Lemmon || Mount Lemmon Survey || HOF || align=right | 3.5 km || 
|-id=840 bgcolor=#E9E9E9
| 435840 ||  || — || October 6, 2008 || Mount Lemmon || Mount Lemmon Survey || — || align=right | 1.6 km || 
|-id=841 bgcolor=#E9E9E9
| 435841 ||  || — || October 28, 2008 || Socorro || LINEAR || — || align=right | 1.4 km || 
|-id=842 bgcolor=#E9E9E9
| 435842 ||  || — || October 30, 2008 || Kitt Peak || Spacewatch || — || align=right | 1.4 km || 
|-id=843 bgcolor=#E9E9E9
| 435843 ||  || — || November 8, 2008 || Kitt Peak || Spacewatch || — || align=right | 2.7 km || 
|-id=844 bgcolor=#E9E9E9
| 435844 ||  || — || October 30, 2008 || Kitt Peak || Spacewatch || — || align=right | 2.8 km || 
|-id=845 bgcolor=#E9E9E9
| 435845 ||  || — || October 31, 2008 || Kitt Peak || Spacewatch || — || align=right | 1.5 km || 
|-id=846 bgcolor=#E9E9E9
| 435846 ||  || — || November 22, 2008 || Kitt Peak || Spacewatch || EUN || align=right | 1.4 km || 
|-id=847 bgcolor=#d6d6d6
| 435847 ||  || — || November 30, 2008 || Mount Lemmon || Mount Lemmon Survey || — || align=right | 1.8 km || 
|-id=848 bgcolor=#E9E9E9
| 435848 ||  || — || November 30, 2008 || Kitt Peak || Spacewatch || — || align=right | 2.1 km || 
|-id=849 bgcolor=#E9E9E9
| 435849 ||  || — || November 19, 2008 || Mount Lemmon || Mount Lemmon Survey || — || align=right | 1.5 km || 
|-id=850 bgcolor=#E9E9E9
| 435850 ||  || — || November 24, 2008 || Mount Lemmon || Mount Lemmon Survey || JUN || align=right | 1.3 km || 
|-id=851 bgcolor=#E9E9E9
| 435851 ||  || — || October 1, 2008 || Catalina || CSS || — || align=right | 1.1 km || 
|-id=852 bgcolor=#E9E9E9
| 435852 ||  || — || November 18, 2008 || Socorro || LINEAR || — || align=right | 2.0 km || 
|-id=853 bgcolor=#E9E9E9
| 435853 ||  || — || November 18, 2008 || Kitt Peak || Spacewatch || — || align=right | 1.9 km || 
|-id=854 bgcolor=#d6d6d6
| 435854 ||  || — || November 20, 2008 || Kitt Peak || Spacewatch || — || align=right | 3.4 km || 
|-id=855 bgcolor=#E9E9E9
| 435855 ||  || — || November 17, 1999 || Catalina || CSS || EUN || align=right | 1.4 km || 
|-id=856 bgcolor=#d6d6d6
| 435856 ||  || — || November 21, 2008 || Mount Lemmon || Mount Lemmon Survey || — || align=right | 2.4 km || 
|-id=857 bgcolor=#E9E9E9
| 435857 ||  || — || November 18, 2008 || Catalina || CSS || — || align=right | 2.7 km || 
|-id=858 bgcolor=#E9E9E9
| 435858 ||  || — || November 9, 2008 || Mount Lemmon || Mount Lemmon Survey || MAR || align=right | 1.2 km || 
|-id=859 bgcolor=#E9E9E9
| 435859 ||  || — || October 28, 2008 || Catalina || CSS || — || align=right | 2.3 km || 
|-id=860 bgcolor=#E9E9E9
| 435860 ||  || — || December 2, 2008 || Kitt Peak || Spacewatch || AGN || align=right data-sort-value="0.92" | 920 m || 
|-id=861 bgcolor=#E9E9E9
| 435861 ||  || — || November 19, 2008 || Mount Lemmon || Mount Lemmon Survey || — || align=right | 1.6 km || 
|-id=862 bgcolor=#d6d6d6
| 435862 ||  || — || December 2, 2008 || Kitt Peak || Spacewatch || Tj (2.99) || align=right | 3.6 km || 
|-id=863 bgcolor=#FA8072
| 435863 ||  || — || December 20, 2008 || Socorro || LINEAR || H || align=right data-sort-value="0.99" | 990 m || 
|-id=864 bgcolor=#E9E9E9
| 435864 ||  || — || December 23, 2008 || Piszkéstető || K. Sárneczky || HOF || align=right | 2.4 km || 
|-id=865 bgcolor=#E9E9E9
| 435865 ||  || — || November 19, 2008 || Mount Lemmon || Mount Lemmon Survey || — || align=right | 2.6 km || 
|-id=866 bgcolor=#d6d6d6
| 435866 ||  || — || October 27, 2003 || Kitt Peak || Spacewatch || — || align=right | 2.9 km || 
|-id=867 bgcolor=#d6d6d6
| 435867 ||  || — || December 29, 2008 || Mount Lemmon || Mount Lemmon Survey || — || align=right | 1.8 km || 
|-id=868 bgcolor=#d6d6d6
| 435868 ||  || — || December 29, 2008 || Mount Lemmon || Mount Lemmon Survey || — || align=right | 1.9 km || 
|-id=869 bgcolor=#d6d6d6
| 435869 ||  || — || December 29, 2008 || Mount Lemmon || Mount Lemmon Survey || EOS || align=right | 1.7 km || 
|-id=870 bgcolor=#d6d6d6
| 435870 ||  || — || December 21, 2008 || Mount Lemmon || Mount Lemmon Survey || EOS || align=right | 1.6 km || 
|-id=871 bgcolor=#E9E9E9
| 435871 ||  || — || September 13, 2007 || Mount Lemmon || Mount Lemmon Survey || EUN || align=right | 1.1 km || 
|-id=872 bgcolor=#d6d6d6
| 435872 ||  || — || December 30, 2008 || Mount Lemmon || Mount Lemmon Survey || — || align=right | 2.3 km || 
|-id=873 bgcolor=#d6d6d6
| 435873 ||  || — || December 29, 2008 || Kitt Peak || Spacewatch || — || align=right | 1.8 km || 
|-id=874 bgcolor=#E9E9E9
| 435874 ||  || — || September 11, 2007 || Catalina || CSS || — || align=right | 2.4 km || 
|-id=875 bgcolor=#E9E9E9
| 435875 ||  || — || December 21, 2008 || Mount Lemmon || Mount Lemmon Survey || AGN || align=right | 1.3 km || 
|-id=876 bgcolor=#E9E9E9
| 435876 ||  || — || December 30, 2008 || Kitt Peak || Spacewatch || DOR || align=right | 2.8 km || 
|-id=877 bgcolor=#d6d6d6
| 435877 ||  || — || December 21, 2008 || Kitt Peak || Spacewatch || — || align=right | 2.0 km || 
|-id=878 bgcolor=#d6d6d6
| 435878 ||  || — || December 4, 2008 || Mount Lemmon || Mount Lemmon Survey || — || align=right | 2.8 km || 
|-id=879 bgcolor=#E9E9E9
| 435879 ||  || — || December 30, 2008 || Kitt Peak || Spacewatch || — || align=right | 1.6 km || 
|-id=880 bgcolor=#d6d6d6
| 435880 ||  || — || December 30, 2008 || Kitt Peak || Spacewatch || — || align=right | 2.4 km || 
|-id=881 bgcolor=#E9E9E9
| 435881 ||  || — || December 30, 2008 || Mount Lemmon || Mount Lemmon Survey || GEF || align=right | 1.3 km || 
|-id=882 bgcolor=#d6d6d6
| 435882 ||  || — || December 30, 2008 || Kitt Peak || Spacewatch || — || align=right | 2.4 km || 
|-id=883 bgcolor=#d6d6d6
| 435883 ||  || — || December 22, 2008 || Kitt Peak || Spacewatch || — || align=right | 2.4 km || 
|-id=884 bgcolor=#d6d6d6
| 435884 ||  || — || December 30, 2008 || Mount Lemmon || Mount Lemmon Survey || — || align=right | 3.0 km || 
|-id=885 bgcolor=#fefefe
| 435885 ||  || — || December 30, 2008 || Catalina || CSS || — || align=right data-sort-value="0.71" | 710 m || 
|-id=886 bgcolor=#d6d6d6
| 435886 ||  || — || December 30, 2008 || Mount Lemmon || Mount Lemmon Survey || — || align=right | 4.5 km || 
|-id=887 bgcolor=#d6d6d6
| 435887 ||  || — || December 22, 2008 || Mount Lemmon || Mount Lemmon Survey || — || align=right | 2.5 km || 
|-id=888 bgcolor=#d6d6d6
| 435888 ||  || — || November 21, 2008 || Catalina || CSS || — || align=right | 3.1 km || 
|-id=889 bgcolor=#d6d6d6
| 435889 ||  || — || December 21, 2008 || Kitt Peak || Spacewatch || — || align=right | 2.3 km || 
|-id=890 bgcolor=#d6d6d6
| 435890 ||  || — || December 31, 2008 || Mount Lemmon || Mount Lemmon Survey || — || align=right | 2.4 km || 
|-id=891 bgcolor=#E9E9E9
| 435891 ||  || — || December 30, 2008 || Mount Lemmon || Mount Lemmon Survey || EUN || align=right | 1.5 km || 
|-id=892 bgcolor=#E9E9E9
| 435892 ||  || — || January 2, 2009 || Catalina || CSS || — || align=right | 2.8 km || 
|-id=893 bgcolor=#d6d6d6
| 435893 ||  || — || December 22, 2008 || Mount Lemmon || Mount Lemmon Survey || KOR || align=right | 1.2 km || 
|-id=894 bgcolor=#d6d6d6
| 435894 ||  || — || January 2, 2009 || Kitt Peak || Spacewatch || — || align=right | 2.0 km || 
|-id=895 bgcolor=#d6d6d6
| 435895 ||  || — || January 15, 2009 || Kitt Peak || Spacewatch || — || align=right | 1.7 km || 
|-id=896 bgcolor=#d6d6d6
| 435896 ||  || — || December 29, 2008 || Mount Lemmon || Mount Lemmon Survey || — || align=right | 2.5 km || 
|-id=897 bgcolor=#d6d6d6
| 435897 ||  || — || January 15, 2009 || Kitt Peak || Spacewatch || — || align=right | 2.8 km || 
|-id=898 bgcolor=#d6d6d6
| 435898 ||  || — || January 15, 2009 || Kitt Peak || Spacewatch || — || align=right | 2.9 km || 
|-id=899 bgcolor=#d6d6d6
| 435899 ||  || — || January 15, 2009 || Kitt Peak || Spacewatch || EOS || align=right | 1.6 km || 
|-id=900 bgcolor=#d6d6d6
| 435900 ||  || — || January 1, 2009 || Kitt Peak || Spacewatch || — || align=right | 2.2 km || 
|}

435901–436000 

|-bgcolor=#d6d6d6
| 435901 || 2009 BU || — || January 16, 2009 || Mayhill || A. Lowe || — || align=right | 2.5 km || 
|-id=902 bgcolor=#d6d6d6
| 435902 ||  || — || January 17, 2009 || Catalina || CSS || — || align=right | 3.7 km || 
|-id=903 bgcolor=#d6d6d6
| 435903 ||  || — || January 18, 2009 || Socorro || LINEAR || — || align=right | 3.4 km || 
|-id=904 bgcolor=#fefefe
| 435904 ||  || — || January 18, 2009 || Socorro || LINEAR || H || align=right data-sort-value="0.89" | 890 m || 
|-id=905 bgcolor=#fefefe
| 435905 ||  || — || January 22, 2009 || Mayhill || A. Lowe || H || align=right data-sort-value="0.83" | 830 m || 
|-id=906 bgcolor=#fefefe
| 435906 ||  || — || January 28, 2009 || Tzec Maun || F. Tozzi || H || align=right | 1.2 km || 
|-id=907 bgcolor=#d6d6d6
| 435907 ||  || — || January 17, 2009 || Kitt Peak || Spacewatch || LIX || align=right | 3.9 km || 
|-id=908 bgcolor=#d6d6d6
| 435908 ||  || — || November 23, 2008 || Mount Lemmon || Mount Lemmon Survey || — || align=right | 2.6 km || 
|-id=909 bgcolor=#d6d6d6
| 435909 ||  || — || January 16, 2009 || Mount Lemmon || Mount Lemmon Survey || — || align=right | 2.0 km || 
|-id=910 bgcolor=#d6d6d6
| 435910 ||  || — || January 16, 2009 || Kitt Peak || Spacewatch || — || align=right | 2.9 km || 
|-id=911 bgcolor=#d6d6d6
| 435911 ||  || — || January 18, 2009 || Mount Lemmon || Mount Lemmon Survey || — || align=right | 2.7 km || 
|-id=912 bgcolor=#d6d6d6
| 435912 ||  || — || January 20, 2009 || Catalina || CSS || — || align=right | 2.5 km || 
|-id=913 bgcolor=#d6d6d6
| 435913 ||  || — || January 30, 2009 || Wildberg || R. Apitzsch || — || align=right | 2.8 km || 
|-id=914 bgcolor=#d6d6d6
| 435914 ||  || — || January 29, 2009 || Wildberg || R. Apitzsch || — || align=right | 3.4 km || 
|-id=915 bgcolor=#d6d6d6
| 435915 ||  || — || January 20, 2009 || Catalina || CSS || — || align=right | 3.9 km || 
|-id=916 bgcolor=#d6d6d6
| 435916 ||  || — || January 25, 2009 || Kitt Peak || Spacewatch || — || align=right | 2.2 km || 
|-id=917 bgcolor=#d6d6d6
| 435917 ||  || — || January 25, 2009 || Kitt Peak || Spacewatch || — || align=right | 2.0 km || 
|-id=918 bgcolor=#d6d6d6
| 435918 ||  || — || January 25, 2009 || Catalina || CSS || — || align=right | 2.6 km || 
|-id=919 bgcolor=#d6d6d6
| 435919 ||  || — || January 26, 2009 || Kitt Peak || Spacewatch || — || align=right | 2.2 km || 
|-id=920 bgcolor=#d6d6d6
| 435920 ||  || — || January 26, 2009 || Mount Lemmon || Mount Lemmon Survey || — || align=right | 3.1 km || 
|-id=921 bgcolor=#d6d6d6
| 435921 ||  || — || January 25, 2009 || Kitt Peak || Spacewatch || EMA || align=right | 3.8 km || 
|-id=922 bgcolor=#d6d6d6
| 435922 ||  || — || December 1, 2008 || Mount Lemmon || Mount Lemmon Survey || — || align=right | 2.6 km || 
|-id=923 bgcolor=#d6d6d6
| 435923 ||  || — || January 26, 2009 || Kitt Peak || Spacewatch || — || align=right | 3.7 km || 
|-id=924 bgcolor=#d6d6d6
| 435924 ||  || — || November 13, 2007 || Mount Lemmon || Mount Lemmon Survey || — || align=right | 2.3 km || 
|-id=925 bgcolor=#d6d6d6
| 435925 ||  || — || November 17, 2007 || Mount Lemmon || Mount Lemmon Survey || — || align=right | 3.0 km || 
|-id=926 bgcolor=#d6d6d6
| 435926 ||  || — || January 29, 2009 || Kitt Peak || Spacewatch || THM || align=right | 2.1 km || 
|-id=927 bgcolor=#d6d6d6
| 435927 ||  || — || January 29, 2009 || Kitt Peak || Spacewatch || — || align=right | 1.9 km || 
|-id=928 bgcolor=#E9E9E9
| 435928 ||  || — || January 29, 2009 || Kitt Peak || Spacewatch || AST || align=right | 1.7 km || 
|-id=929 bgcolor=#d6d6d6
| 435929 ||  || — || November 18, 2007 || Mount Lemmon || Mount Lemmon Survey || KOR || align=right | 1.3 km || 
|-id=930 bgcolor=#d6d6d6
| 435930 ||  || — || January 30, 2009 || Kitt Peak || Spacewatch || — || align=right | 2.1 km || 
|-id=931 bgcolor=#d6d6d6
| 435931 ||  || — || January 25, 2009 || Kitt Peak || Spacewatch || — || align=right | 2.3 km || 
|-id=932 bgcolor=#d6d6d6
| 435932 ||  || — || December 21, 2008 || Kitt Peak || Spacewatch || NAE || align=right | 1.8 km || 
|-id=933 bgcolor=#d6d6d6
| 435933 ||  || — || March 18, 2004 || Kitt Peak || Spacewatch || — || align=right | 2.6 km || 
|-id=934 bgcolor=#d6d6d6
| 435934 ||  || — || January 31, 2009 || Cerro Burek || Alianza S4 Obs. || — || align=right | 2.5 km || 
|-id=935 bgcolor=#d6d6d6
| 435935 ||  || — || January 17, 2009 || Kitt Peak || Spacewatch || — || align=right | 3.1 km || 
|-id=936 bgcolor=#d6d6d6
| 435936 ||  || — || January 25, 2009 || Kitt Peak || Spacewatch || EOS || align=right | 1.5 km || 
|-id=937 bgcolor=#d6d6d6
| 435937 ||  || — || January 18, 2009 || Kitt Peak || Spacewatch || — || align=right | 2.7 km || 
|-id=938 bgcolor=#d6d6d6
| 435938 ||  || — || February 2, 2009 || Moletai || K. Černis, J. Zdanavičius || — || align=right | 2.5 km || 
|-id=939 bgcolor=#d6d6d6
| 435939 ||  || — || February 1, 2009 || Mount Lemmon || Mount Lemmon Survey || — || align=right | 3.7 km || 
|-id=940 bgcolor=#d6d6d6
| 435940 ||  || — || February 1, 2009 || Kitt Peak || Spacewatch || EOS || align=right | 1.6 km || 
|-id=941 bgcolor=#d6d6d6
| 435941 ||  || — || February 1, 2009 || Kitt Peak || Spacewatch || — || align=right | 2.6 km || 
|-id=942 bgcolor=#d6d6d6
| 435942 ||  || — || January 17, 2009 || Kitt Peak || Spacewatch || — || align=right | 3.3 km || 
|-id=943 bgcolor=#d6d6d6
| 435943 ||  || — || February 14, 2009 || Heppenheim || Starkenburg Obs. || — || align=right | 2.7 km || 
|-id=944 bgcolor=#d6d6d6
| 435944 ||  || — || February 14, 2009 || Mount Lemmon || Mount Lemmon Survey || — || align=right | 3.0 km || 
|-id=945 bgcolor=#d6d6d6
| 435945 ||  || — || February 14, 2009 || Catalina || CSS || Tj (2.99) || align=right | 4.1 km || 
|-id=946 bgcolor=#d6d6d6
| 435946 ||  || — || February 4, 2009 || Kitt Peak || Spacewatch || — || align=right | 2.6 km || 
|-id=947 bgcolor=#d6d6d6
| 435947 ||  || — || February 3, 2009 || Mount Lemmon || Mount Lemmon Survey || — || align=right | 2.5 km || 
|-id=948 bgcolor=#d6d6d6
| 435948 ||  || — || February 4, 2009 || Mount Lemmon || Mount Lemmon Survey || — || align=right | 3.4 km || 
|-id=949 bgcolor=#d6d6d6
| 435949 ||  || — || February 19, 2009 || Magdalena Ridge || W. H. Ryan || — || align=right | 3.4 km || 
|-id=950 bgcolor=#d6d6d6
| 435950 Bad Königshofen ||  ||  || February 21, 2009 || Calar Alto || F. Hormuth || — || align=right | 3.4 km || 
|-id=951 bgcolor=#d6d6d6
| 435951 ||  || — || February 17, 2009 || Dauban || F. Kugel || HYG || align=right | 2.9 km || 
|-id=952 bgcolor=#E9E9E9
| 435952 ||  || — || February 19, 2009 || Mount Lemmon || Mount Lemmon Survey || — || align=right | 1.9 km || 
|-id=953 bgcolor=#d6d6d6
| 435953 ||  || — || February 17, 2009 || Kitt Peak || Spacewatch || — || align=right | 1.8 km || 
|-id=954 bgcolor=#d6d6d6
| 435954 ||  || — || February 21, 2009 || Mount Lemmon || Mount Lemmon Survey || — || align=right | 2.7 km || 
|-id=955 bgcolor=#d6d6d6
| 435955 ||  || — || February 23, 2009 || Calar Alto || F. Hormuth || — || align=right | 2.9 km || 
|-id=956 bgcolor=#d6d6d6
| 435956 ||  || — || February 20, 2009 || Kitt Peak || Spacewatch || — || align=right | 2.7 km || 
|-id=957 bgcolor=#d6d6d6
| 435957 ||  || — || February 24, 2009 || Calar Alto || F. Hormuth || — || align=right | 3.1 km || 
|-id=958 bgcolor=#d6d6d6
| 435958 ||  || — || February 3, 2009 || Mount Lemmon || Mount Lemmon Survey || — || align=right | 2.7 km || 
|-id=959 bgcolor=#d6d6d6
| 435959 ||  || — || February 20, 2009 || Dauban || F. Kugel || EOS || align=right | 1.9 km || 
|-id=960 bgcolor=#d6d6d6
| 435960 ||  || — || January 31, 2009 || Kitt Peak || Spacewatch || EOS || align=right | 1.8 km || 
|-id=961 bgcolor=#d6d6d6
| 435961 ||  || — || February 19, 2009 || Kitt Peak || Spacewatch || — || align=right | 2.2 km || 
|-id=962 bgcolor=#d6d6d6
| 435962 ||  || — || February 5, 2009 || Kitt Peak || Spacewatch || EOS || align=right | 1.7 km || 
|-id=963 bgcolor=#d6d6d6
| 435963 ||  || — || January 16, 2009 || Kitt Peak || Spacewatch || EOS || align=right | 1.8 km || 
|-id=964 bgcolor=#d6d6d6
| 435964 ||  || — || February 22, 2009 || Kitt Peak || Spacewatch || EOS || align=right | 2.3 km || 
|-id=965 bgcolor=#d6d6d6
| 435965 ||  || — || March 16, 2004 || Kitt Peak || Spacewatch || — || align=right | 3.1 km || 
|-id=966 bgcolor=#d6d6d6
| 435966 ||  || — || January 31, 2009 || Kitt Peak || Spacewatch || — || align=right | 2.1 km || 
|-id=967 bgcolor=#d6d6d6
| 435967 ||  || — || February 24, 2009 || Mount Lemmon || Mount Lemmon Survey || — || align=right | 2.2 km || 
|-id=968 bgcolor=#d6d6d6
| 435968 ||  || — || January 31, 2009 || Kitt Peak || Spacewatch || — || align=right | 2.8 km || 
|-id=969 bgcolor=#d6d6d6
| 435969 ||  || — || February 17, 2009 || La Sagra || OAM Obs. || — || align=right | 2.5 km || 
|-id=970 bgcolor=#d6d6d6
| 435970 ||  || — || December 30, 2008 || Mount Lemmon || Mount Lemmon Survey || — || align=right | 2.6 km || 
|-id=971 bgcolor=#d6d6d6
| 435971 ||  || — || September 14, 2006 || Kitt Peak || Spacewatch ||  || align=right | 2.9 km || 
|-id=972 bgcolor=#d6d6d6
| 435972 ||  || — || February 24, 2009 || Kitt Peak || Spacewatch || EOS || align=right | 2.3 km || 
|-id=973 bgcolor=#d6d6d6
| 435973 ||  || — || February 24, 2009 || Kitt Peak || Spacewatch || — || align=right | 2.9 km || 
|-id=974 bgcolor=#d6d6d6
| 435974 ||  || — || February 24, 2009 || Kitt Peak || Spacewatch || — || align=right | 2.9 km || 
|-id=975 bgcolor=#d6d6d6
| 435975 ||  || — || February 24, 2009 || Kitt Peak || Spacewatch || HYG || align=right | 2.5 km || 
|-id=976 bgcolor=#d6d6d6
| 435976 ||  || — || February 26, 2009 || Kitt Peak || Spacewatch || HYG || align=right | 3.0 km || 
|-id=977 bgcolor=#d6d6d6
| 435977 ||  || — || February 28, 2009 || Mount Lemmon || Mount Lemmon Survey || — || align=right | 3.0 km || 
|-id=978 bgcolor=#d6d6d6
| 435978 ||  || — || February 28, 2009 || Mount Lemmon || Mount Lemmon Survey || — || align=right | 2.8 km || 
|-id=979 bgcolor=#d6d6d6
| 435979 ||  || — || November 18, 2007 || Mount Lemmon || Mount Lemmon Survey || THM || align=right | 1.8 km || 
|-id=980 bgcolor=#d6d6d6
| 435980 ||  || — || February 27, 2009 || Kitt Peak || Spacewatch || TIR || align=right | 2.6 km || 
|-id=981 bgcolor=#d6d6d6
| 435981 ||  || — || February 20, 2009 || Kitt Peak || Spacewatch || — || align=right | 3.8 km || 
|-id=982 bgcolor=#d6d6d6
| 435982 ||  || — || February 27, 2009 || Kitt Peak || Spacewatch || — || align=right | 2.8 km || 
|-id=983 bgcolor=#d6d6d6
| 435983 ||  || — || February 20, 2009 || Kitt Peak || Spacewatch || — || align=right | 2.7 km || 
|-id=984 bgcolor=#d6d6d6
| 435984 ||  || — || March 1, 2009 || Kitt Peak || Spacewatch || — || align=right | 3.3 km || 
|-id=985 bgcolor=#d6d6d6
| 435985 ||  || — || March 2, 2009 || Mount Lemmon || Mount Lemmon Survey || — || align=right | 2.1 km || 
|-id=986 bgcolor=#d6d6d6
| 435986 ||  || — || March 2, 2009 || Mount Lemmon || Mount Lemmon Survey || — || align=right | 3.3 km || 
|-id=987 bgcolor=#d6d6d6
| 435987 ||  || — || March 1, 2009 || Mount Lemmon || Mount Lemmon Survey || — || align=right | 3.0 km || 
|-id=988 bgcolor=#d6d6d6
| 435988 ||  || — || March 15, 2009 || Kitt Peak || Spacewatch || — || align=right | 1.8 km || 
|-id=989 bgcolor=#d6d6d6
| 435989 ||  || — || February 19, 2009 || Kitt Peak || Spacewatch || — || align=right | 2.8 km || 
|-id=990 bgcolor=#d6d6d6
| 435990 ||  || — || March 3, 2009 || Catalina || CSS || EMA || align=right | 3.5 km || 
|-id=991 bgcolor=#d6d6d6
| 435991 ||  || — || February 3, 2009 || Mount Lemmon || Mount Lemmon Survey || — || align=right | 4.3 km || 
|-id=992 bgcolor=#d6d6d6
| 435992 ||  || — || February 4, 2009 || Kitt Peak || Spacewatch || — || align=right | 2.4 km || 
|-id=993 bgcolor=#fefefe
| 435993 ||  || — || March 17, 2009 || Kitt Peak || Spacewatch || H || align=right data-sort-value="0.79" | 790 m || 
|-id=994 bgcolor=#d6d6d6
| 435994 ||  || — || March 17, 2009 || Kitt Peak || Spacewatch || EOS || align=right | 1.5 km || 
|-id=995 bgcolor=#d6d6d6
| 435995 ||  || — || March 18, 2009 || Mount Lemmon || Mount Lemmon Survey || EOS || align=right | 2.1 km || 
|-id=996 bgcolor=#d6d6d6
| 435996 ||  || — || February 26, 2009 || Kitt Peak || Spacewatch || — || align=right | 3.0 km || 
|-id=997 bgcolor=#fefefe
| 435997 ||  || — || March 18, 2009 || Catalina || CSS || — || align=right data-sort-value="0.82" | 820 m || 
|-id=998 bgcolor=#d6d6d6
| 435998 ||  || — || March 17, 2009 || Kitt Peak || Spacewatch || — || align=right | 2.6 km || 
|-id=999 bgcolor=#d6d6d6
| 435999 ||  || — || March 21, 2009 || Bergisch Gladbach || W. Bickel || (1118) || align=right | 2.9 km || 
|-id=000 bgcolor=#d6d6d6
| 436000 ||  || — || March 17, 2009 || Uccle || Uccle Obs. || EOS || align=right | 2.1 km || 
|}

References

External links 
 Discovery Circumstances: Numbered Minor Planets (435001)–(440000) (IAU Minor Planet Center)

0435